= Portable Draughts Notation =

Computer data format for recording draughts games

Portable Draughts Notation (.PDN) is the standard computer-processable format for recording draughts games. This format is derived from Portable Game Notation, which is the standard chess format.

PDN files are text files which must contain Tag Pairs and Movetext for each game.

== Tag Pairs ==
Tag pairs begin with "[", the name of the tag, the tag value enclosed in double-quotes, and a closing "]". There must be a newline after each tag. Tag names are case-sensitive.

PDN data for archival storage is required to provide 7 tags.

Event
the name of the tournament or match event
Site
the location of the event. This is in "City, Region COUNTRY" format, where COUNTRY is the 3-letter International Olympic Committee code for the country. An example is "New York City, NY USA".
Date
the starting date of the game, in YYYY.MM.DD form. "??" are used for unknown values
Round
the playing round ordinal of the game
White
the player of the White pieces, in "last name, first name" format
Black
the player of the Black pieces, same format as White
Result
the result of the game. This can only have four possible values: "1-0" (White won), "0-1" (Black won), "1/2-1/2" (Draw), or "*" (other, e.g., the game is ongoing)

FEN
the initial position of the checkers board. This is used to record partial games (starting at some initial position). It is also necessary for some draughts variants where the initial position is not always the same as traditional checkers. If a FEN tag is used, a separate tag pair "SetUp" is required and have its value set to "1".

A position can be stored by the FEN tag:

[SetUp "1"]
[FEN "[Turn]:[Color 1][K][Square number][,]...]:[Color 2][K][Square number][,]...]"]

Turn
the side to move, B for Black, W for White
Color 1 and Color 2
the color for the Square numbers that follow B for Black, W, and the sequence is unimportant.
K
optional before square number, indicates the piece on that square is a king, otherwise it is a man.
Square number
indicates the square number occupied by a piece. The square number must be at least a "1". On an 8×8 board, it has a range from 1-32. These are comma separated, and the sequence is unimportant.

Examples:

[FEN "B:W18,24,27,28,K10,K15:B12,16,20,K22,K25,K29"]

[FEN "B:W18,19,21,23,24,26,29,30,31,32:B1,2,3,4,6,7,9,10,11,12"]

== Movetext ==
Movetext contains the actual moves for the game. Moves begin with the source square number, then a "-" or "x", finally destination square number. Jumps must be specified by each square that would be jumped ("11x18x25"), or two squares only ("11x25").

The end of the game must contain the 4 standard result codes: "1-0", "1/2-1/2" "0-1", and "*". The codes must be the same as the Result tag pair.

An annotator who wishes to suggest alternative moves to those actually played in the game may insert variations enclosed in parentheses.

Comments may be added by either a ";" (a comment that continues to the end of the line) or a "{" (which continues until a matching "}"). Comments do not nest.

== Variants ==
PDN can be used in a wide variety of draughts variants synthesized with different board sizes. For example, PDN can represent 8 × 8 and 10 × 10 boards. It can represent unmatched board sizes by specifying unequivalent values in the Board-width and the Board-height headers. It can include the optional GameType tag to differentiate between different variants.

[GameType "Type-number [,Start color (W/B),Board width, Board height, Notation [,Invert-flag]]"]

Type-number
this is one of the following type-numbers:
- 0: Chess
- 1: Chinese chess
- 2-19: future chess expansion
- 20: 10 × 10 draughts (international)
- 21: English draughts (kings only move 1 step at a time)
- 22: Italian draughts (as English, Men cannot take kings, must capture max)
- 23: American pool draughts (as 10 × 10, not obliged to take max)
- 24: Spanish pool draughts (as 10 × 10 rules, but men cannot capture backwards)
- 25: Russian draughts
- 26: Brazilian 8 × 8 draughts (same as 10 × 10 rules)
- 27: Canadian 12 × 12 draughts (same as 10 × 10 rules)
- 28: Portuguese draughts
- 29: Czech draughts
- 30: Turkish draughts
- 31: Thai draughts
- 40: Frisian draughts
- 41: Spantsiretti (Russian draughts 10 × 8)
- 32-39, 42-49: Future draughts expansion
- 50: Othello
- 98: Antidraughts

Start-color
B for Black, W for White
Board-width
board width
Board-height
board height
Notation
- A - alpha/numeric like chess
- N - numeric like draughts
- S - SAN - short-form chess notation. Then follows a number 0-4 telling where square A1 or 1 is for the side who starts the game (White or Black), 0 = Bottom left, 1=Bottom right, 2=Top left, 3=Top right.
Invert-flag
- 0 - pieces on dark squares
- 1 - pieces on light squares

== Example ==
 [Event "itsyourturn.com USA vs. World 8/04"]
 [Site ""]
 [Date "2004.08.23"]
 [Round "1"]
 [Black "Lindus Edwards"]
 [White "Anthony Perez"]
 [Result "1/2-1/2"]
 
 1. 11-15 23-18 2. 8-11 26-23 {Crescent Cross} 3. 10-14 30-26 4. 6-10 24-19 5.
 15-24 27-20* {28-19 loses PP} 6. 4-8 {the popular book line is 12-16 28-24 4-8
 22-17* 8-12 32-28* = same} 32-27 {Perez' cook; 28-24 apparently goes to the
 previous note} 7. 12-16 {seems to be the only move with any strength} 27-24 8.
 8-12 22-17 {returning to the book line mentioned earlier} 9. 10-15 17-10 10.
 7-14 26-22* 1/2-1/2 {a very popular position} 1/2-1/2
 
 [Event "The Royal Tour"]
 [Site ""]
 [Date "??"]
 [Round "1"]
 [Black "a"]
 [White "b"]
 [Result "1-0"]
 [Setup "1"]
 [FEN "W:W27,19,18,11,7,6,5:B28,26,25,20,17,10,9,4,3,2."]
 
 {27-24 Beginning a spectacular shot in which White pitches (almost) all his men
 } 1. 19-15 10x19 2. 5-1 3x10 3. 11-8 4x11 4. 27-24 20x27 5. 18-14 9x18 6. 1-5
 2x9 {2-9 and now the coup de grace that inspired the name of this problem...}
 7. 5x32 {5-32 (Several different jumping sequences are possible, for example 5
 x 14 x 7 x 16 x 23 x 14 x 21 x 30 x 23 x 32) White Wins. As an interesting side
 note, this nine-piece jump is the theoretical maximum number of pieces it is
 possible to jump in a single turn in checkers (try setting up a 10-piece jump -
 the board lacks sufficient space!)} 1-0
 
 [Event "WK 2003"]
 [Site "Zwartewaterland, Netherlands"]
 [Round "1"]
 [Date "2003.05.23"]
 [White "Ndjofang, J.M."]
 [Black "Heusdens, R."]
 [Result "1/2-1/2"]
 [GameType "20"]
 
 1. 32-28 17-22 2. 28x17 12x21 3. 31-26 7-12 4. 26x17 12x21 5. 36-31 19-23 6.
 34-29 23x34 7. 39x30 20-24 8. 30x19 14x23 9. 37-32 21-27 10. 31x22 18x27 11.
 32x21 16x27 12. 41-37 10-14 13. 46-41 11-17 14. 33-29 23x34 15. 40x29 6-11 16.
 35-30 14-20 17. 45-40 20-24 18. 30x19 13x33 19. 38x29 5-10 20. 42-38 10-14 21.
 44-39 8-12 22. 40-34 14-19 23. 50-44 2-7 24. 48-42 19-23 25. 29x18 12x23 26.
 39-33 7-12 27. 33-28 23x32 28. 37x28 9-13 29. 44-39 3-9 30. 38-33 9-14 31.
 34-30 17-21 32. 33-29 21-26 33. 43-38 1-7 34. 41-37 11-17 35. 39-34 7-11 36.
 30-24 11-16 37. 34-30 27-31 38. 28-23 16-21 39. 30-25 12-18 40. 23x12 17x8
 1/2-1/2

== See also ==
- Portable Game Notation – Format for recording chess games
