= Checkerboard =

Board with an alternating square pattern on which games are played

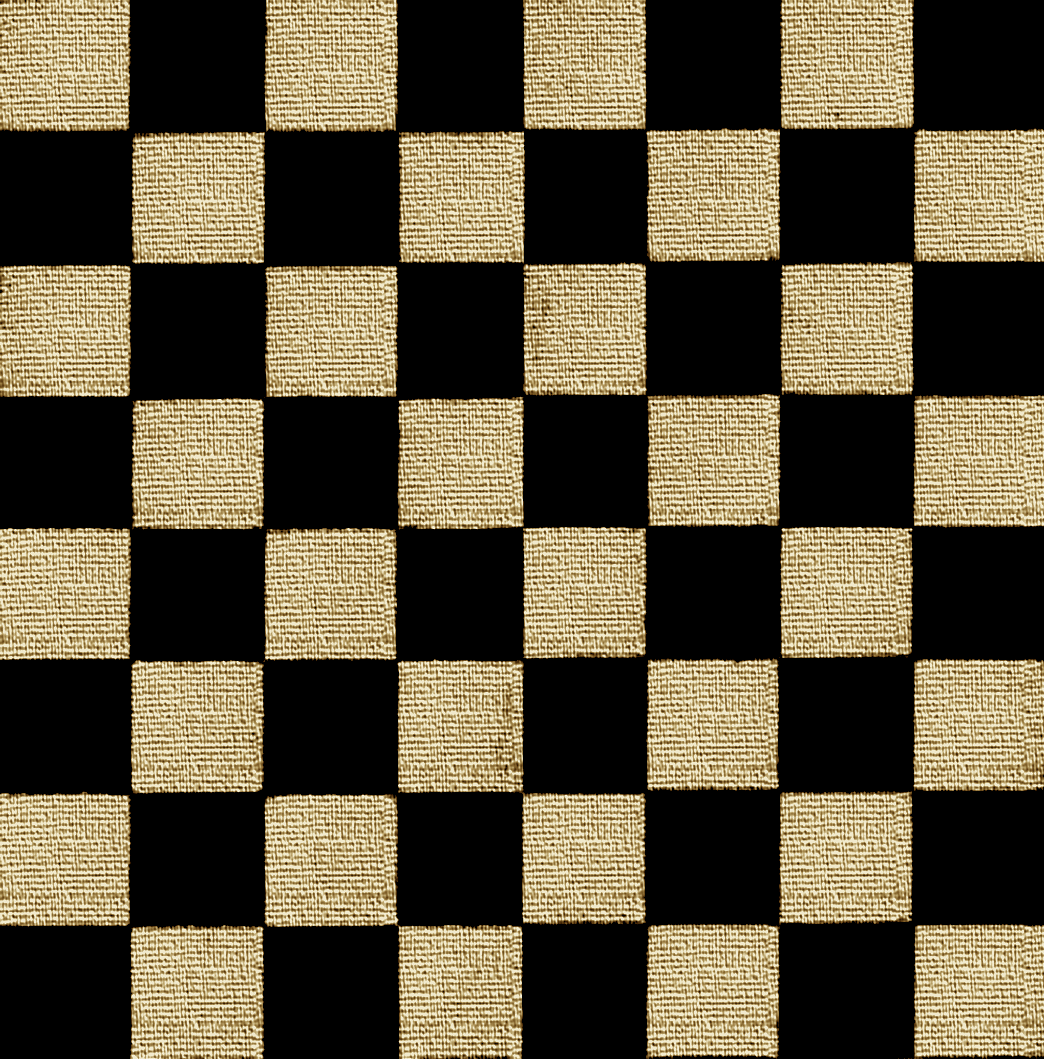
A checkerboard

A checkerboard (American English) or chequerboard (British English) is a game board of checkered pattern on which checkers (also known as English draughts) is played. Most commonly, it consists of 64 squares (8×8) of alternating dark and light color, typically green and buff (official tournaments), black and red (consumer commercial), or black and white (printed diagrams). An 8×8 checkerboard is used to play many other games, including chess, whereby it is known as a chessboard. In The Netherlands, a dambord (checker board) has 10 rows and 10 columns for 100 squares in total (see article International draughts). Other rectangular square-tiled boards are also often called checkerboards.

== Games and puzzles using checkerboards ==
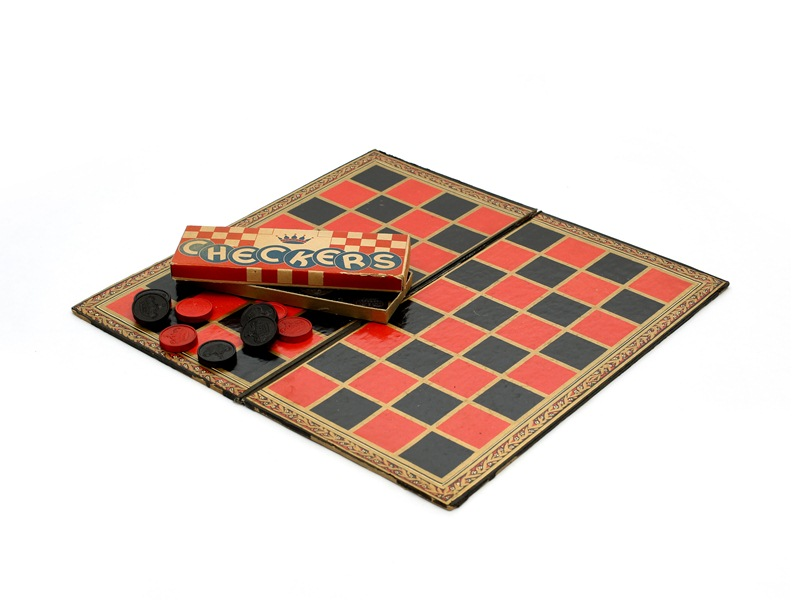
A game of checkers within the permanent collection of The Children's Museum of Indianapolis

Martin Gardner featured puzzles based on checkerboards in his November 1962 Mathematical Games column in Scientific American. A square checkerboard with an alternating pattern is used for games including:

- Amazons
- Chapayev
- Chess and some of its variants (see chessboard)
- Czech draughts
- Checkers, also known as draughts
- Fox games
- Frisian draughts
- Gounki
- International draughts
- Italian draughts
- Lines of Action
- Pool checkers
- Russian checkers

The following games require an 8×8 board and are sometimes played on a chessboard.

- Arimaa
- Breakthrough
- Crossings
- Mak-yek
- Makruk
- Martian Chess

== Gallery ==
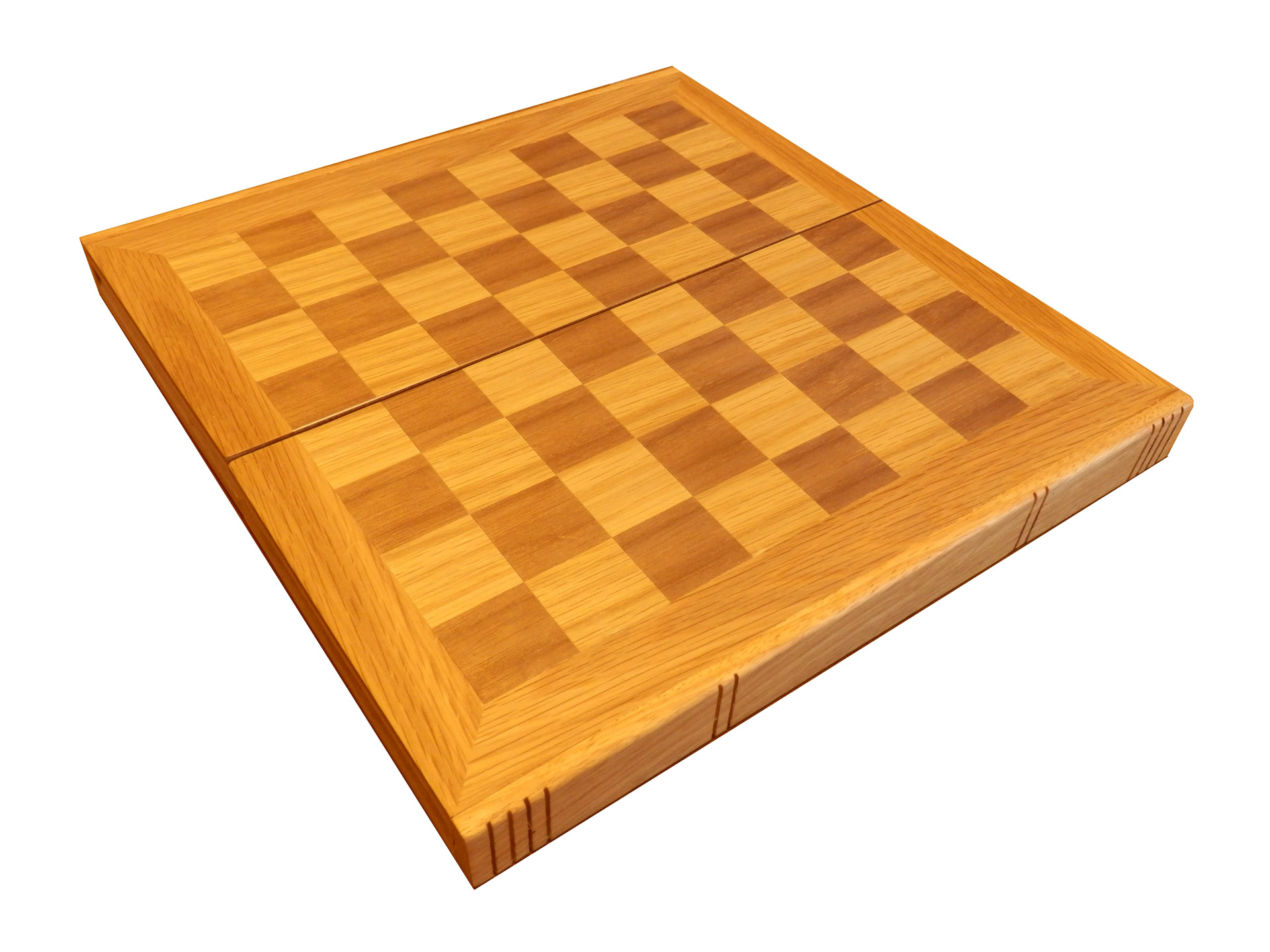
An empty 8×8 checkerboard

An empty 8×8 checkerboard diagram

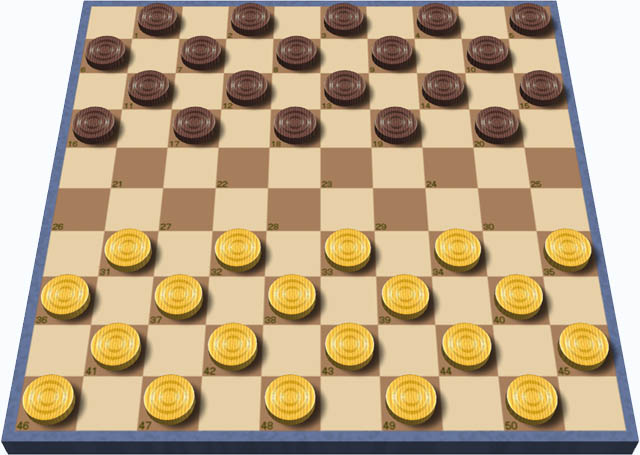
The opening setup of international draughts, which uses a 10×10 checkerboard

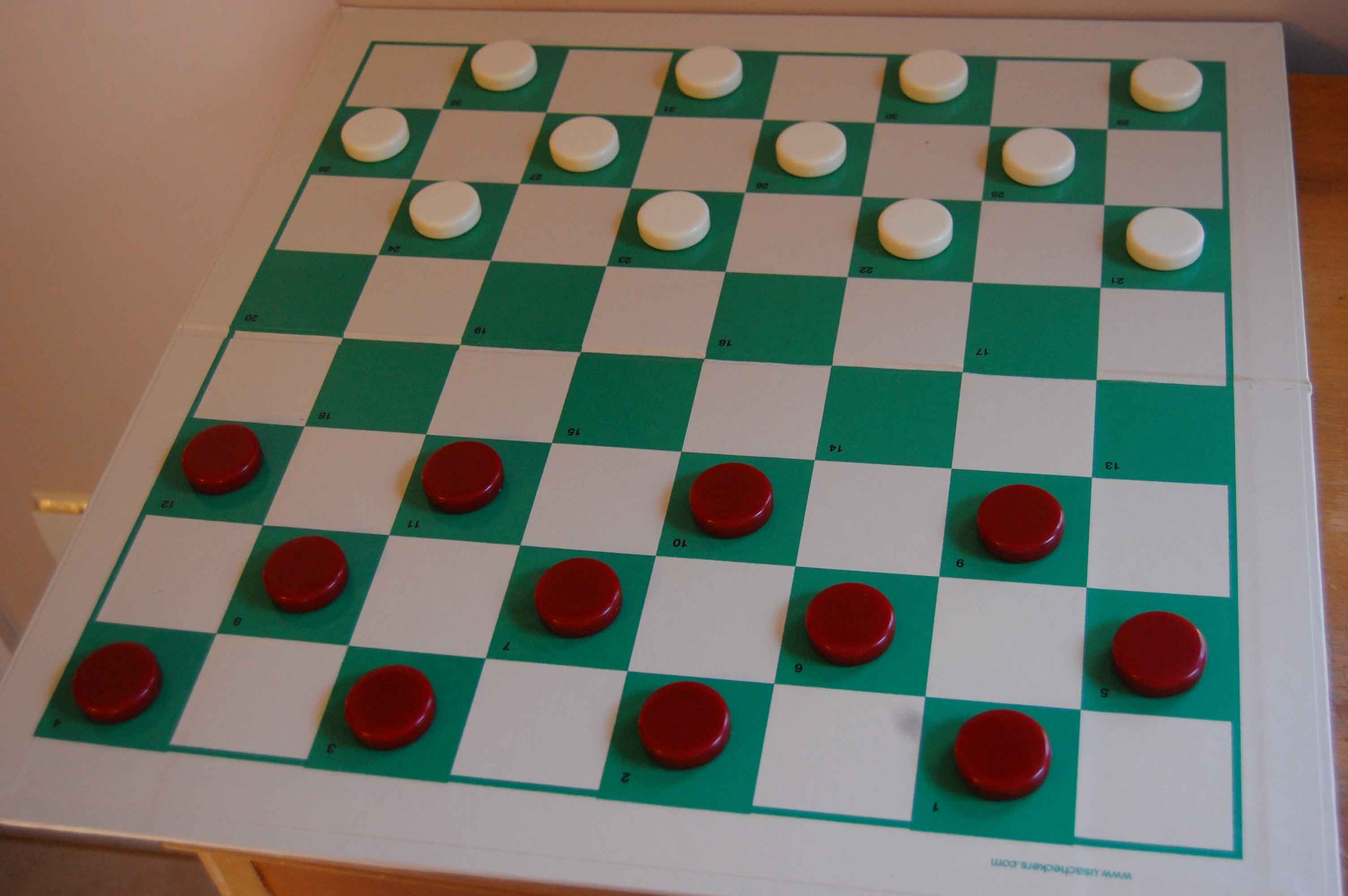
English draughts tournament standard

== Mathematical description ==
Given a grid with $m$ rows and $n$ columns, a function $f(m,n)$,

$$\displaystyle {f(m,n)} = \begin{cases}
\text{black} & \text{if}\ m \equiv n \pmod 2 \, , \\
\text{white} & \text{if}\ m \not\equiv n \pmod 2\\
\end{cases}$$

or, alternatively,

$$\displaystyle {f(m,n)} = \begin{cases}
\text{black} & \text{if}\ m + n \text{ is even}, \\
\text{white} & \text{if}\ m + n \text{ is odd} \\
\end{cases}$$

The element $(m,n)=(0,0)$ is black and represents the lower left corner of the board.

== Encoding ==
In Unicode, checkerboard characters are encoded at various code points:

- U+2427 ␧ SYMBOL FOR DELETE SQUARE CHECKER BOARD FORM
- U+2428 ␨ SYMBOL FOR DELETE RECTANGULAR CHECKER BOARD FORM
- U+1F67E 🙾 CHECKER BOARD
- U+1F67F 🙿 REVERSE CHECKER BOARD
- U+1FB95 🮕 CHECKER BOARD FILL
- U+1FB96 🮖 INVERSE CHECKER BOARD FILL

== See also ==
- Chessboard
- Croatian checkerboard
- Hexmap
- Warenne Check
