= Makhos =

Makhos may refer to:

- Machos, Elis, a community in Greece
- Thai checkers or Makhos, a variant of checkers
