= Malaysian/Singaporean checkers =

Malaysian/Singaporean Checkers
	1		2		3		4		5		6
7		8		9		10		11		12
	13		14		15		16		17		18
19		20		21		22		23		24
	25		26		27		28		29		30
31		32		33		34		35		36
	37		38		39		40		41		42
43		44		45		46		47		48
	49		50		51		52		53		54
55		56		57		58		59		60
	61		62		63		64		65		66
67		68		69		70		71		72
Malaysian checkers or Singaporean checkers board and starting setup. Played on 12×12 board
- Genres: Board game Abstract strategy game Mind sport
- Players: 2
- Skills: Strategy, tactics
- Synonyms: Dum, Dam

Malaysian checkers or Singaporean checkers is a variant of the board game of draughts played primarily in Malaysia and Singapore, especially among the elder men. Similar to the Canadian checkers, it is played on a 12×12 checkered board. The game can also be played on a 8×8 board if a 12×12 board is unavailable. However, it is distinct from Checkers and Canadian Checkers in terms of its additional rules. Popular alternative names used locally for this game include Dum and Dam.

== Game rules ==
Malaysian/Singaporean checkers follows the same rules as international draughts, with exceptions being pieces not able to move backwards (towards the player), the requirement to forfeit a capturing piece if the player fails to or wishes not to capture any enemy piece(s) with it, and a larger gameboard (12×12 squares instead of 10×10), and more checkers per player (30 instead of 20). The starting setup is shown in the diagram.

=== Starting position ===
- The game is played on a board of 12×12 alternating dark and light squares. The lower-leftmost square should be dark. Alternatively it may also be played on a 8×8 board with a similarly checkered pattern.
- Each player has 30 pieces (12 in an 8×8 board setup). In the starting position (see illustration) the pieces are placed on the first five rows closest to the players. This leaves two central rows empty.

=== Moves and captures ===
- Each players move one piece per turn. Players choose who goes first (by tossing a coin / scissors paper stone etc). Then turns alternate.
- Ordinary pieces move one square diagonally forward to an unoccupied square.
- Enemy pieces can and must be captured by jumping over the enemy piece, two squares forward to an unoccupied square immediately beyond. If a jump is possible it must be done, even if doing so incurs a disadvantage.
  - Multiple successive jumps forward in a single turn can and must be made if after each jump there is an unoccupied square immediately beyond the enemy piece. It is compulsory to jump over as many pieces as possible with the capturing piece.
  - A jumped piece is removed from the board at the end of the turn. (So for a multi-jump move, jumped pieces are not removed during the move, they are removed only after the entire multi-jump move is complete.)
  - The same piece may not be jumped more than once.
  - If a player fails to capture any possible enemy pieces or simply wishes not to and continues with a non-capturing move, then the capturing piece that was required to jump should be 'forfeited' and removed from the board.

=== Crowning ===
- A piece is crowned if it stops on the far edge of the board at the end of its turn. Another piece is placed on top of it to mark it. Crowned pieces, sometimes called kings, can move freely multiple steps in any direction diagonally and may jump over and hence capture an opponent piece some distance away and choose where to stop afterwards. Any sequence may be chosen, as long as all possible captures are made. 'Forfeiting' rules apply.

=== Winning and draws ===
- A player with no valid move remaining loses. This occurs if the player has no pieces left, or if all the player's pieces are obstructed from moving by opponent pieces.
- A game is a draw if neither opponent has the possibility to win the game.

== See also ==
- Canadian checkers - similar board game with distinct rules and conventions
