= Poddavki =

Board game

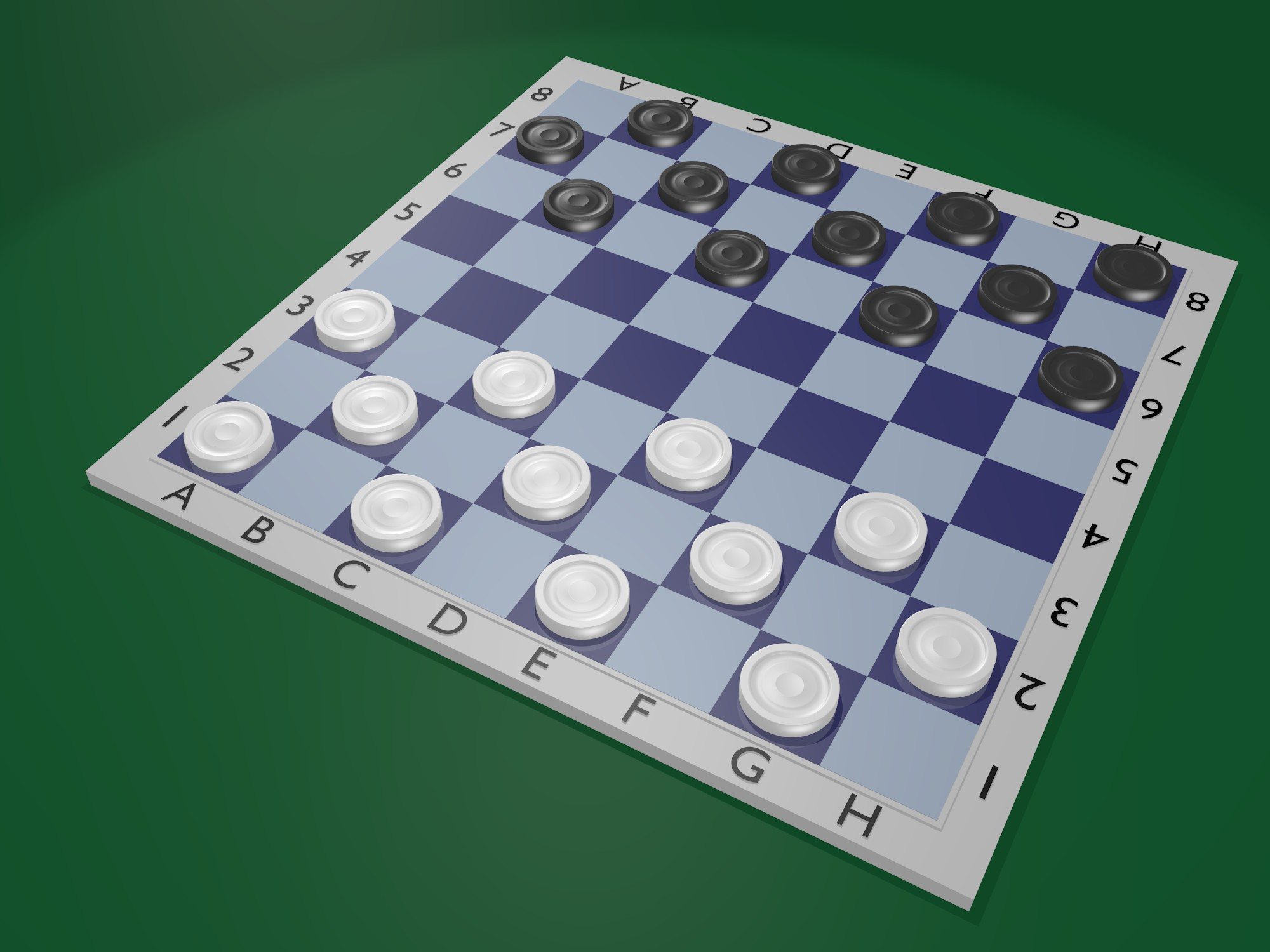
- Poddavki starting position
- Genres: Board game Abstract strategy game
- Players: 2
- Setup time: 10–60 seconds
- Chance: None
- Skills: Strategy

Poddavki (Russian: поддавки́, IPA: [pədːɐˈfkʲi], "giveaway"), also known as Giveaway checkers, Suicide checkers, Anti-checkers or Losing draughts is a draughts (checkers) game based on the rules of Russian draughts, with the variation that a player wins if they have no legal moves on their turn, either by giving up all their pieces or having them all blocked. As in most varieties of draughts, capturing is mandatory. The game is played in Russia and some parts of the former Soviet Union.

== Rules ==
- Board. Poddavki is played on an 8×8 board with alternating dark and light squares. The left down square field should be dark.
- Starting position. Each player starts with 12 pieces on the three rows closest to their own side. The row closest to each player is called the "crownhead" or "kings row". Usually, the colors of the pieces are black and white, but possible use other colors (one dark and other light). The player with white pieces (lighter color) moves first.
- Pieces. There are two kinds of pieces: "men" and "kings". Kings are differentiated as consisting of two normal pieces of the same color, stacked one on top of the other or by inverted pieces.
- Men. Men move forward diagonally to an adjacent unoccupied square.
- Kings. If a player's piece moves into the kings row on the opposing player's side of the board, that piece to be "crowned", becoming a "king" and gaining the ability to move back or forward and choose on which free square at this diagonal to stop.
- Capture. If the adjacent square contains an opponent's piece, and the square immediately beyond it is vacant, the opponent's piece may be captured (and removed from the game) by jumping over it. Jumping can be done forward and backward. Multiple-jump moves are possible if, when the jumping piece lands, there is another piece that can be jumped. Jumping is mandatory and cannot be passed up to make a non-jumping move. When there is more than one way for a player to jump, one may choose which sequence to make, not necessarily the sequence that will result in the most captures. However, one must make all the captures in that sequence. A captured piece is left on the board until all captures in a sequence have been made but cannot be jumped again (this rule also applies for the kings).
- If a man touches the kings row during a capture and can continue a capture, it jumps backwards as a king. The player can choose where to land after the capture.
- Winning. A player with no valid move remaining win. This is the case if the player either has no pieces left or if a player's pieces are obstructed from making a legal move by the pieces of the opponent.

== Notation ==
Games and positions are recorded using a special notation – algebraic notation. The vertical columns of squares are labeled from a to h. The horizontal rows of squares are numbered 1 to 8 starting from White's side of the board. Thus each square of the board has a unique identification of file letter followed by rank number.

- Move from e3 to d4 are recorded as e3-d4.
- Move with capture are recorded as c5:e3 (used a colon :).

	1		2		3		4
5		6		7		8
	9		10		11		12
13		14		15		16
	17		18		19		20
21		22		23		24
	25		26		27		28
29		30		31		32

Starting position. White move first.

 1. e3-d4 d6-c5
 2. g3-f4 c5:e3:g5
 3. ...

== Sport ==
First Russian championships was held in 2011. Next took place annually.
