= Checkers =

Strategy board game

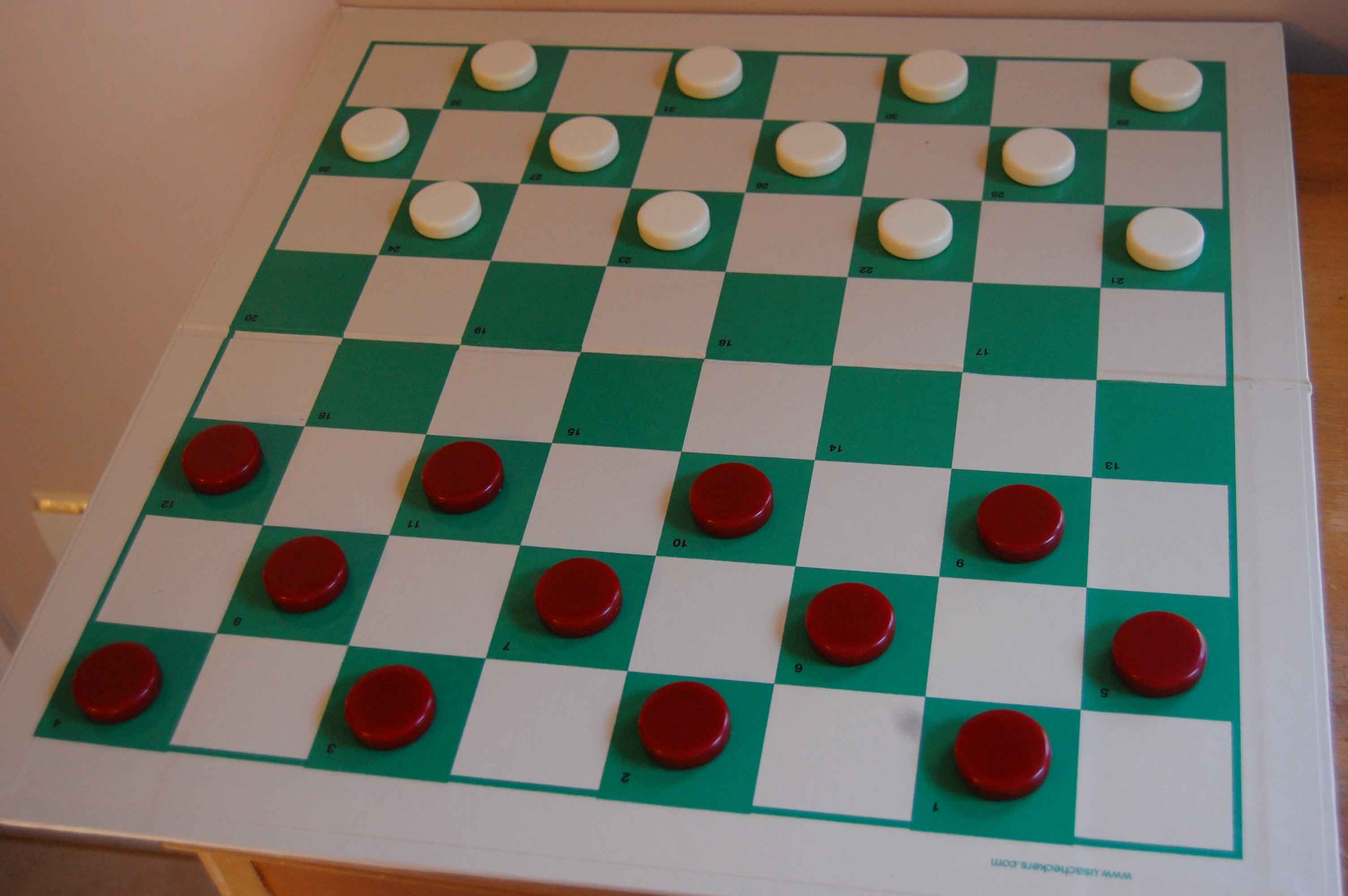
- Starting position for American checkers on an 8×8 checkerboard; Black (red) moves first.
- Years active: at least 5,000
- Genres: Board game; Abstract strategy game; Mind sport
- Players: 2
- Playing time: Casual games usually last 10 to 30 minutes; tournament games last anywhere from about 60 minutes to 3 hours or more.
- Chance: None
- Age range: 6+
- Skills: Strategy, tactics
- Synonyms: Draughts; Drafts; Chequers

Checkers (Note: When used in the UK, this term is usually spelled chequers (as in Chinese chequers) when referring to the pattern of the checkerboard (or chequerboard). See American and British spelling differences for further information.) (North American English), also known as draughts (/drɑːfts, -æ-/; British English), is a group of strategy board games for two players which involve forward movements of uniform game pieces and mandatory captures by jumping over opponent pieces. Checkers is developed from alquerque. The term "checkers" derives from the checkered board which the game is played on, whereas "draughts" derives from the verb "to draw" or "to move".

The most popular forms of checkers in Anglophone countries are American checkers (also called English draughts), which is played on an 8×8 checkerboard; Russian draughts, Turkish draughts and Armenian draughts, all of them on an 8×8 board; and international draughts, played on a 10×10 board – with the last widely played in many countries worldwide. There are many other variants played on 8×8 boards. Canadian checkers and Malaysian/Singaporean checkers (also locally known as dam) are played on a 12×12 board.

American checkers was weakly solved in 2007 by a team of Canadian computer scientists led by Jonathan Schaeffer. From the standard starting position, perfect play by each side will result in a draw.

== General rules ==
Checkers is played by two opponents on opposite sides of the gameboard. One player has dark pieces (usually black); the other has light pieces (usually white or red). The player with the darker color moves first, then players alternate turns. A player cannot move the opponent's pieces. A move consists of moving a piece diagonally by 1 square to an unoccupied square. All pieces move forward only at the beginning of the game. At the beginning of a player's turn, if the diagonal square of a player's piece (in the player's forward direction) contains an opponent's piece, and the square immediately beyond it is vacant, the piece may be captured (must be captured in most international rules) by jumping over it. The captured piece is then removed from the board.

Only the dark squares of the checkerboard are used. A piece can only move into an unoccupied square. When capturing an opponent's piece is possible, capturing is mandatory in most official rules. If the player does not capture, the other player can remove the opponent's piece as a penalty (or muffin), and where there are two or more such positions the player forfeits pieces that cannot be moved (although some rule variations make capturing optional). In almost all variants, a player with no valid move remaining loses. This occurs if the player has no pieces left, or if all the player's pieces are obstructed from moving by opponent pieces.

Checkers can also be played online. It is common to play on various free apps found on the App Store and the Google Play Store.

=== Pieces ===
==== Man ====
An uncrowned piece (man) moves one step ahead and captures a diagonal opponent's piece by jumping over it and landing on the next square. Multiple enemy pieces can be captured in a single turn provided this is done by successive jumps made by a single piece; the jumps do not need to be on the same diagonal direction and may "zigzag" (change direction). In American checkers and Spanish draughts, men can jump only forwards; in international draughts and Russian draughts, men can jump both forwards and backwards.

==== King ====
Example of a game of international draughts (10×10 board), showcasing the flying king (the move "Les Blancs prennent 6 pions...")

When a man reaches the farthest row forward, known as the kings row or crown head, it becomes a king. It is marked by placing an additional piece on top of, or crowning, the first man. The king has additional powers, namely the ability to move any amount of squares at a time (in international checkers), move backwards and, in variants where men cannot already do so, capture backwards. Like a man, a king can make successive jumps in a single turn, provided that each jump captures an enemy piece.

In international draughts, kings can move any number of squares, forward or backward. Kings with such an ability are also informally called flying kings. They may capture an opposing man, regardless of distance, by jumping to any of the unoccupied squares past the man. Because jumped pieces remain on the board until the turn is completed, it is possible to reach a position in a multi-jump move where the flying king is blocked from capturing further by a piece already jumped.

Flying kings are not used in American checkers; a king's only advantage over a man is the additional ability to move and capture backwards.

== Naming ==
In most non-English languages (except those that acquired the game from English speakers), checkers is called dame, dames, damas, or a similar term that refers to ladies. The pieces are usually called men, stones, "peón" (pawn) or a similar term; men promoted to kings are called dames or ladies. In these languages, the queen in chess or in card games is usually called by the same term as the kings in checkers. A case in point includes the Greek terminology, in which checkers is called "ντάμα" (dama), which is also one term for the queen in chess.

== History ==
=== Ancient origins ===
The ancestry of checkers / draughts remains shrouded in uncertainty. Popular accounts frequently trace the game back thousands of years to ancient Mesopotamia and Egypt, though such claims warrant careful examination. Archaeological discoveries in Ur, an ancient Mesopotamian city in present-day Iraq, have yielded game boards dating to approximately 3000 BCE. However, characterizing these as early checkers boards stretches credibility. The Game of Ur employed seven markers per player and three tetrahedral dice, functioning as a race game more akin to modern backgammon than to checkers. The gameplay mechanics of these games bear little resemblance to the jumping and capturing that define draughts.

Egyptian sources have generated similar confusion. In the British Museum are specimens of ancient Egyptian checker-patterned boards, found with their pieces in burial chambers, games using these boards were played by the pharaoh Hatshepsut. Various sources cite carvings at the temple of Kurna, allegedly from 1400 BC, as evidence of ancient checkers. These roof-slab etchings have been attributed to multiple games: Alquerque, Nine Men's Morris, and Zamma. The presence of Coptic crosses in some diagrams casts doubt on their antiquity, since such symbols would not have appeared in 1400 BC. The carvings likely date from considerably later periods.

The Ancient Greeks and Romans played capture games (Petteia and Latrunculi respectively) which have some similarity to checkers, in that the goal is capture the opponent's pieces on a board of squares.

=== Alquerque ===
A more likely true ancestor to checkers is Alquerque, which was played on a distinctive 5×5 grid with intersecting lines. The 10th-century Arab scholar Abu al-Faraj al-Isfahani mentioned a game called Quirkat or Al-Quirkat in his Kitab al-Aghani though he provided no rules. Al qirq was also the name for a game similar to nine men's morris. These games were brought to Spain by the Moors, where they became known as Alquerque, the Spanish derivation of the Arabic name. The 1283 Libro de los Juegos, commissioned by Alfonso X of Castile, offered actual gameplay instructions. The Libro de los Juegos describes Alquerque as a game for twelve pieces per side on twenty-five positions. Movement followed board lines to adjacent points. Capture occurred by jumping, potentially in multiple sequences. The text emphasizes that players should guard their pieces carefully, suggesting tactical depth.

Alquerque board and setup

Determining whether Alquerque mandated forced captures proves difficult from the surviving Libro de los Juegos source. The manuscript describes how the first player must expose a piece and the second must capture it, but whether this represents a rule or simply describes optimal play remains unclear. Modern draughts players consider compulsory capture fundamental, but historical evidence suggests variations existed where capture remained optional.

The question of promotion—whether pieces reaching the opposite edge gained enhanced powers—similarly lacks clear documentation. Most contemporary historians believe Alquerque featured forward-only movement but debate whether promotion existed. The absence of any mention of promoted pieces in the Libro de los Juegos seems significant. Rule descriptions typically explain new piece types, yet the manuscript remains silent on this point.

=== The transition to chess boards ===
Sometime between the 13th and 16th centuries, draughts developed as an Alquerque game that migrated from the Alquerque grid to chess boards. This transition produced a curious split as the game developed along two distinct paths. In Europe, players adopted the checkered board and restricted movement to diagonal lines. This European game was already being played in 1100, probably in the south of France. This development led to what became English Draughts or Checkers. The diagonal-only movement introduced forced progress, as pieces advanced toward the opponent's back rank without possibility of cycling endlessly. This innovation came at the cost of half the board becoming unusable.

In the Arab world, the game moved to plain 8×8 boards and retained orthogonal (straight line) movement. This branch evolved into Turkish Draughts. The Turkish variant emerged with sophisticated rules, including the "long king", which was a promoted piece capable of moving multiple squares in any orthogonal direction. Both evolutionary paths sacrificed something from Alquerque's original design, since the original game allowed straight and diagonal movement. Each descendant specialized however, losing the combined movement patterns of the original.

=== European developments ===
The rule of crowning was used by the 13th century, as it is mentioned in the Philippe Mouskés's Chronique in 1243 when the game was known as Fierges, the name used for the chess queen (derived from the Persian ferz, meaning royal counsellor or vizier). The pieces became known as "dames" when that name was also adopted for the chess queen.

Between 1300 and 1600, European draughts underwent extensive experimentation. Players tested various rule combinations, debating fundamental mechanics such as mandatory capture and backward capture, as well as different powers for promoted pieces. Two major variants emerged: "le Jeu Forcé," which required captures, and "le Jeu Plaisant," where captures remained optional. The rule forcing players to take whenever possible was introduced in France, where these games became known as Jeu forcé, similar to modern American checkers. The game without forced capture became known as Le jeu plaisant de dames, the precursor of international checkers. Optional-capture draughts persisted for centuries.

Enforcement of enforced capture proved problematic. Rather than treating failure to capture as an illegal move, players developed "huffing"—removing the offending piece as punishment while still allowing the violation. Players could thus deliberately neglect captures when losing the non-capturing piece proved less damaging than executing the capture. Huffing could thus be used as a strategic weapon. Not until the late 19th century did European draughts finally abandon huffing, with English-speaking countries holding out longest.

The game called Polish Draughts (French: le jeu de dames à la polonaise) emerged around 1700, though its origin story contains questionable elements. According to popular legend, the variant was invented in Paris around 1723 when a Polish courtier and a French officer expanded the board to 10×10 squares and introduced several refinements like backward capture, the long king, and mandatory majority capture (when multiple capturing sequences exist, players must choose the one capturing the most pieces). However, the evidence contradicts this popular narrative. A 1710 French-Dutch dictionary includes the phrase "Can you play Polish draughts?" This predates the supposed Parisian invention by over a decade. The name's origin thus remains mysterious.

Polish Draughts became International Draughts, also known as Continental Draughts, the most widely played variant outside English-speaking countries. It incorporated:

- A 10×10 board with fifty playing squares
- Compulsory capture with majority precedence
- Flying kings that could move multiple squares diagonally
- Backward capturing by both regular pieces and kings
- Immediate promotion where pieces reaching the back rank became kings during the same turn

The variant's tactical richness attracted serious players as combinations and endgames became more elaborate. Draughts theory soon began accumulating. English mathematician William Payne wrote the earliest book in English about the game in 1756, which included a foreword by Samuel Johnson.

=== Strategic evolution and the draw problem ===
As International Draughts matured through the 20th century, strategic understanding deepened considerably. The "romantic" period was characterized by aggressive combination-seeking. This gave way to more analytical approaches as players recognized that hunting combinations required positional weaknesses that opponents could exploit. French and Dutch players dominated early decades. Isidore Weiss held the unofficial world championship from 1899 to 1911, representing romantic combination play at its peak. Alfred Molimard dethroned him in 1912, demonstrating that sound positional play defeated pure tactics. Herman Hoogland, Benedictus Springer, and eventually Piet Roozenburg further refined game strategy.

The Fédération Mondiale du Jeu de Dames (World Draughts Federation) was founded in 1947 by the French, Dutch, Belgian, and Swiss organizations. They have organized championships every two years since 1948. The Soviet Union entered competitive draughts in the 1950s. Russian players like Koeperman, Shchyogolev, and Andreiko dominated from 1958 through the 1970s, interrupted only by Senegalese player Baba Sy's 1963 title (though the championship match was never played after the Soviet Union denied him a visa).

As theory converged toward optimal play, draws proliferated. The long king on diagonal boards possessed such powerful defensive resources that capturing a lone king typically required four pieces rather than two. World championship matches increasingly ended without decisive games. For example, the 1971 Andreiko-Koeperman match produced twenty consecutive draws.

By the 21st century, the "draw death" situation had become critical. Championship formats introduced rapid games and blitz tiebreaks after drawn classical games. The 2009 championship between Schwartzman and Georgiev saw twelve consecutive draws before "micro matches" determined the winner. By 2015, all seven regulation games in the world championship ended drawn. In 2016, ten time winner Alexander Georgiev withdrew from championship competition, having lost motivation after countless draws. The exhibition match between younger players Jan Groenendijk and Roel Boomstra, where Boomstra won four out of twelve games, was celebrated as proof the game remained vibrant. Such celebration of merely four decisive games reveals the depth of the crisis. The draw rate at elite levels has also driven away spectators and sponsors.

Players and organizers have proposed numerous remedies such as awarding three points for wins instead of two, restricting king movement, altering board sizes, and introducing random elements. Each solution faces resistance from players invested in existing theory and tradition. Without structural changes, International draughts risks a steep decline.

== Variants ==
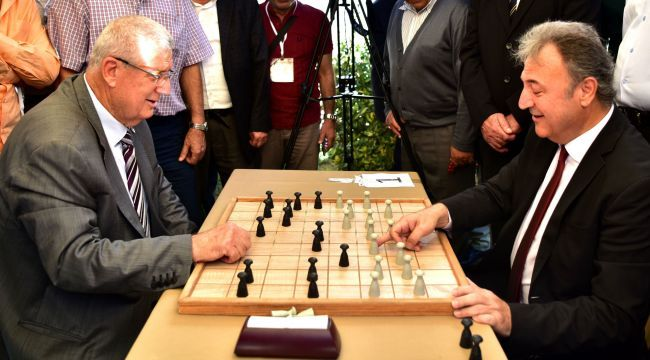
Opening of the Bornova International Turkish draughts Tournament

=== Traditional ===
English Draughts (American Checkers) represents a classic simpler game played on sixty-four squares with twelve pieces per side. It features short kings that move one square at a time. In 2007, computer analysis proved Checkers a theoretical draw with perfect play. Yet the game's complexity prevents human players from achieving such perfection, maintaining competitive interest.

International Draughts, with a 10x10 board and flying kings, is the most popular version outside the Anglosphere and it is still played in elite tournaments.

There are numerous other traditional variants of the game, including:

- Russian draughts uses an 8×8 board while retaining international rules with key modifications. It eliminated majority capture precedence and introduced the flying king. Pieces promote immediately upon reaching the back rank and continue moving as kings in the same turn.
- Canadian draughts, played on a 12x12 board. "Sri Lankan draughts" is similarly a 12x12 version of international draughts.
- Frisian draughts uniquely reintegrated straight-line captures (vertically and horizontally) into the diagonal European framework. Pieces capture both diagonally and orthogonally, recovering some of Alquerque's original versatility.
- Turkish draughts retained orthogonal movement and developed sophisticated rules including the long king.
- Armenian draughts adds diagonal movement to Turkish rules.
- Thai checkers, which has a king that can only land on the vacant square immediately beyond a captured piece.
- Zamma, played on square board with the Alquerque pattern.
- Kharbaga, similar to Zamma, but the Alquerque pattern is rotated.
- Yoté, a unique variant where the board begins empty and enter the board as the game progresses
- Bashni (Russian: ба́шни, towers), 19th century progenitor of all column checkers variants, which allows one to stack draughtsmen after capture into "towers" or "columns". Other similar stacking checker variants include the Dutch Stapeldammen and Emergo.

=== Modern designs ===
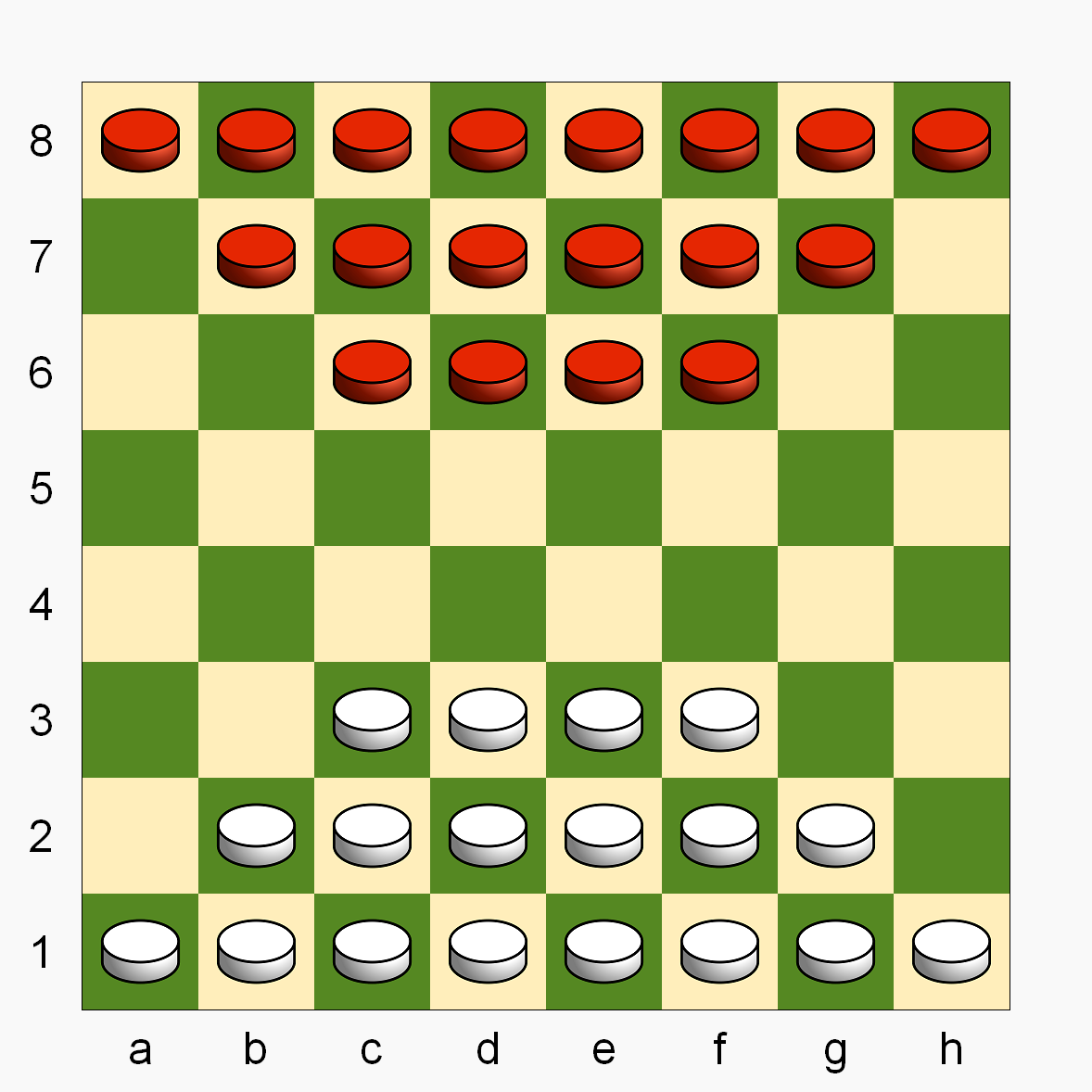
Dameo starting position

More recently, modern game designers developed new forms of draughts. Some of these include:

- Blue and Gray: On a 9×9 board, each side has 17 guard pieces that move and jump in any direction, to escort a captain piece which races to the center of the board to win.
- Cheskers: A variant invented by Solomon Golomb. Each player begins with a bishop and a camel (which jumps with coordinates (3,1) rather than (2,1) so as to stay on the black squares), and men reaching the back rank promote to a bishop, camel, or king.
- Damath: A variant utilizing math principles and numbered chips popular in the Philippines.
- Dameo: A variant played on an 8×8 board that utilizes all 64 squares and has diagonal and orthogonal movement. A special "sliding" move is used for moving a line of checkers similar to the movement rule in Epaminondas. By Christian Freeling (2000).
- Hexdame: A literal adaptation of international draughts to a hexagonal gameboard. By Christian Freeling (1979).
- Lasca: A checkers variant on a 7×7 board, with 25 fields used. Jumped pieces are placed under the jumper, so that towers are built. Only the top piece of a jumped tower is captured. This variant was invented by World Chess Champion Emanuel Lasker.
- Loca: A checkers variant with pieces, including men, that move short but capture long. By Christian Freeling (2020).
- Philosophy shogi checkers: A variant on a 9×9 board, game ending with capturing opponent's king. Invented by Inoue Enryō and described in Japanese book in 1890.
- Suicide checkers (also called Anti-Checkers, Giveaway Checkers or Losing Draughts): A variant where the objective of each player is to lose all of their pieces.
- Stavropol Checkers: Russian variant which allows one to move the opponent's pieces as well as one's own.
- Quadraughts (2011), a four player variant
- King's court (1986), where players fight for control of the center four squares

== Computer checkers ==
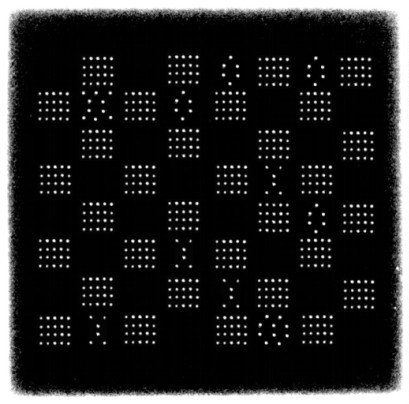
Christopher Strachey's Checkers (1952), an early video game

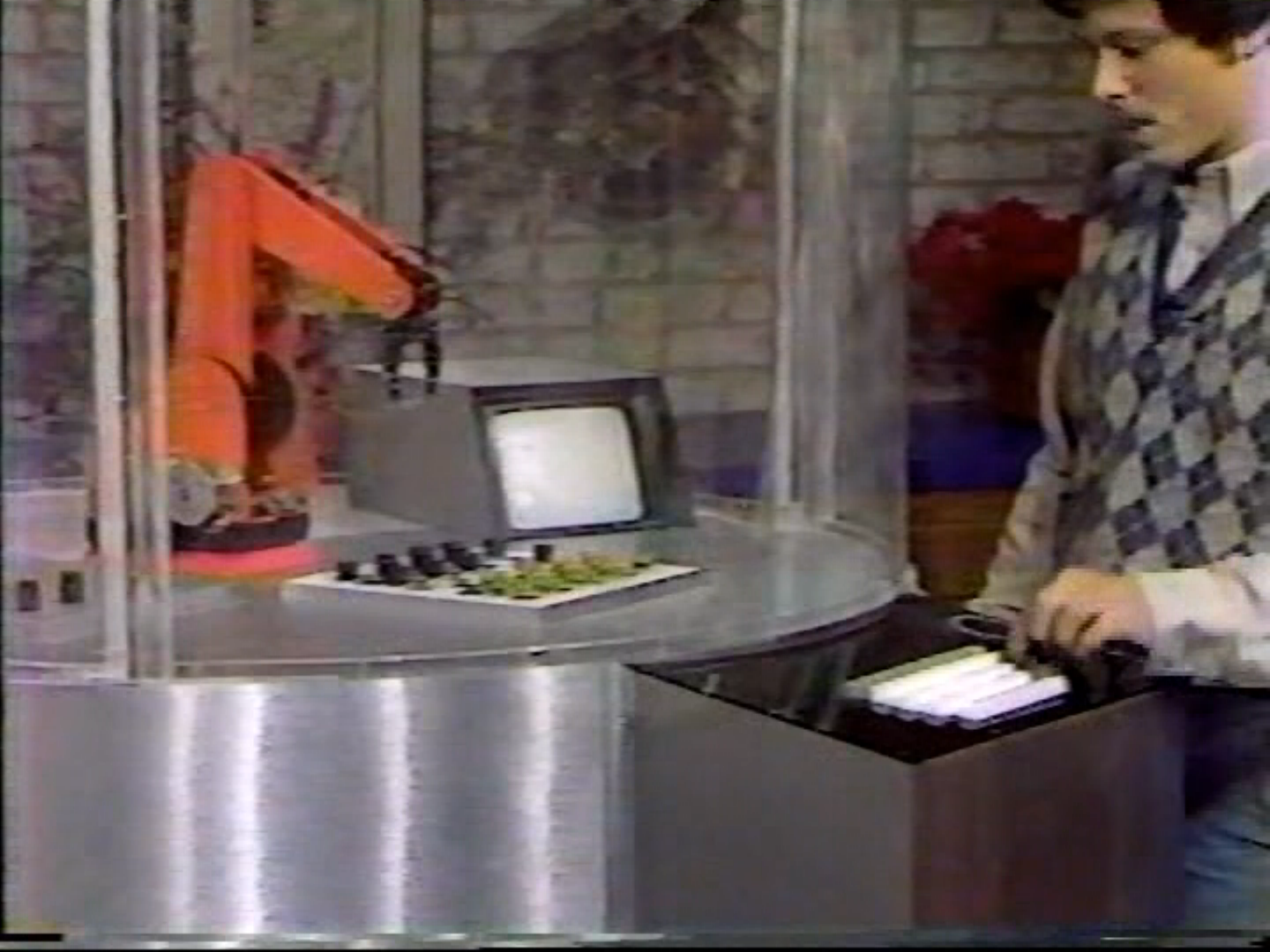
Scott M. Savage's checkers (1983) the first robot game

American checkers has been the arena for several notable advances in game artificial intelligence. In 1951 Christopher Strachey created Checkers, a simulation of the board game. The checkers game tried to run for the first time on 30 July 1951 at NPL, but was unsuccessful due to program errors. In the summer of 1952 he successfully ran the program on Ferranti Mark 1 computer and played the first computer checkers and one of the first video games according to many definitions. In the 1950s, Arthur Samuel created one of the first board game-playing programs of any kind. More recently, in 2007 scientists at the University of Alberta developed their "Chinook" program to the point where it is unbeatable. A brute force approach that took hundreds of computers working nearly two decades was used to solve the game, showing that a game of checkers will always end in a draw if neither player makes a mistake. The solution is for the checkers variation called go-as-you-please (GAYP) checkers and not for the variation called three-move restriction checkers; however, it is a legal three-move restriction game because only openings believed to lose are barred under the three-move restriction.

In 1983, the Science Museum Oklahoma (then called the Omniplex) unveiled a new exhibit: Lefty the Checker Playing Robot. Programmed by Scott M. Savage, Lefty used an Armdroid robotic arm by Colne Robotics and was powered by a 6502 processor with a combination of Basic and Assembly code to interactively play a round of checkers with visitors to the museum. Originally, the program was deliberately simple so that the average museum visitor could potentially win, but over time was improved. The improvements, however, proved to be more frustrating for the visitors, so the original code was reimplemented.

== Computational complexity ==
Generalized Checkers is played on an M × N board.

It is PSPACE-hard to determine whether a specified player has a winning strategy. And if a polynomial bound is placed on the number of moves that are allowed in between jumps (which is a reasonable generalization of the drawing rule in standard Checkers), then the problem is in PSPACE, thus it is PSPACE-complete. However, without this bound, Checkers is EXPTIME-complete.

However, other problems have only polynomial complexity:

- Can one player remove all the other player's pieces in one move (by several jumps)?
- Can one player king a piece in one move?

== National and regional variants ==
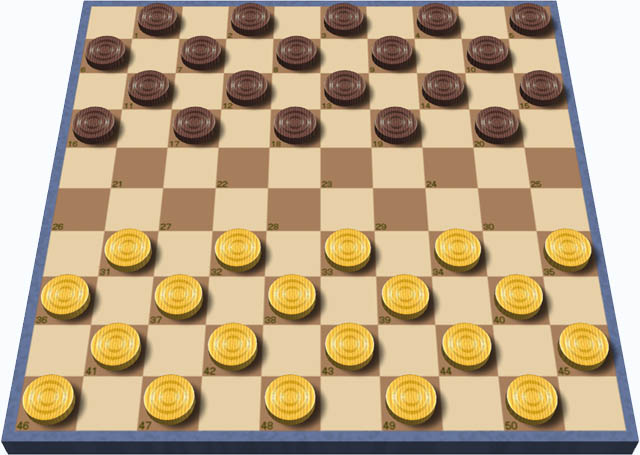
10×10 board, starting position in international draughts

8×8 board, starting position in English, Brazilian, Czech, Tanzanian draughts and Russian draughts, as well as Pool checkers

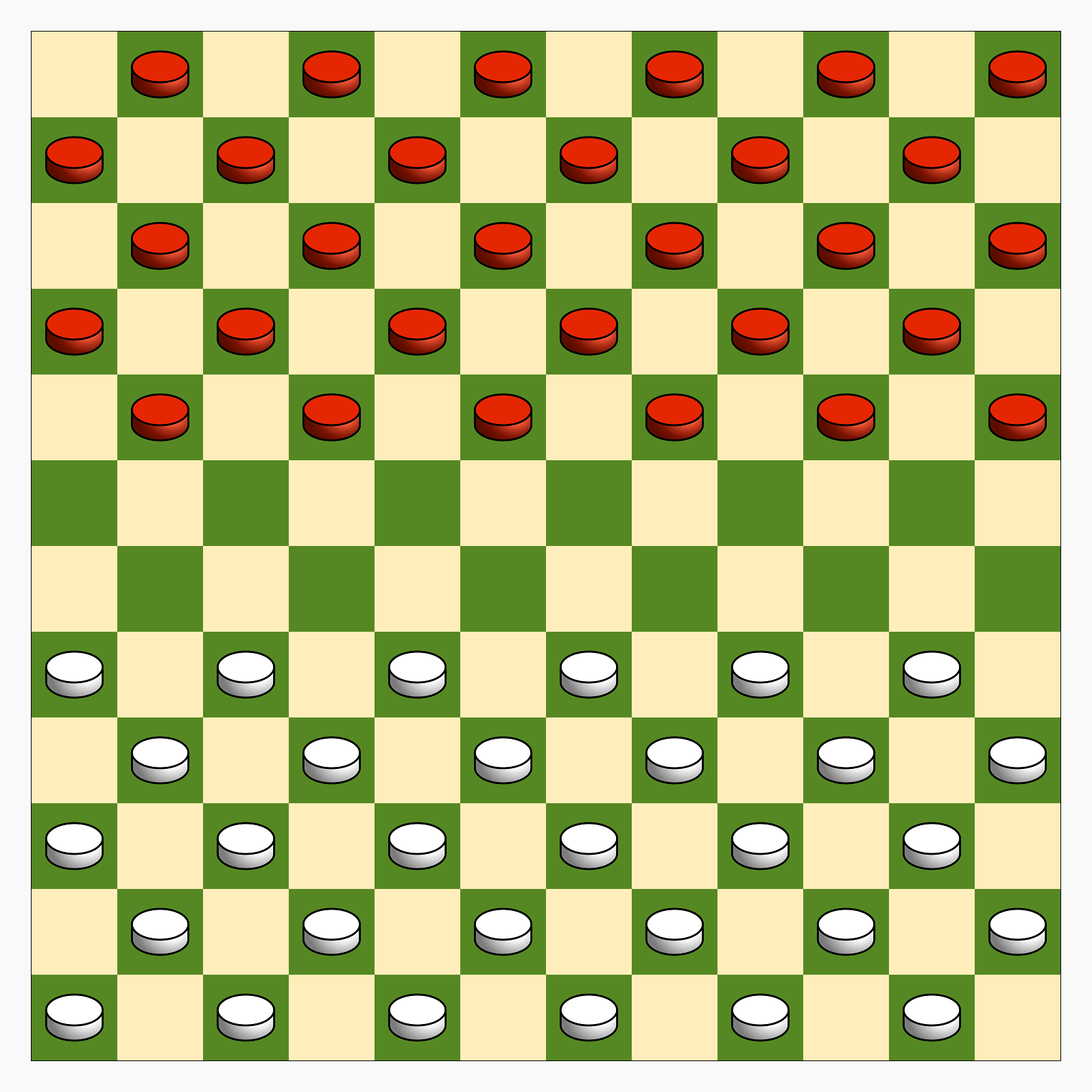
12×12 board, starting position in Canadian draughts

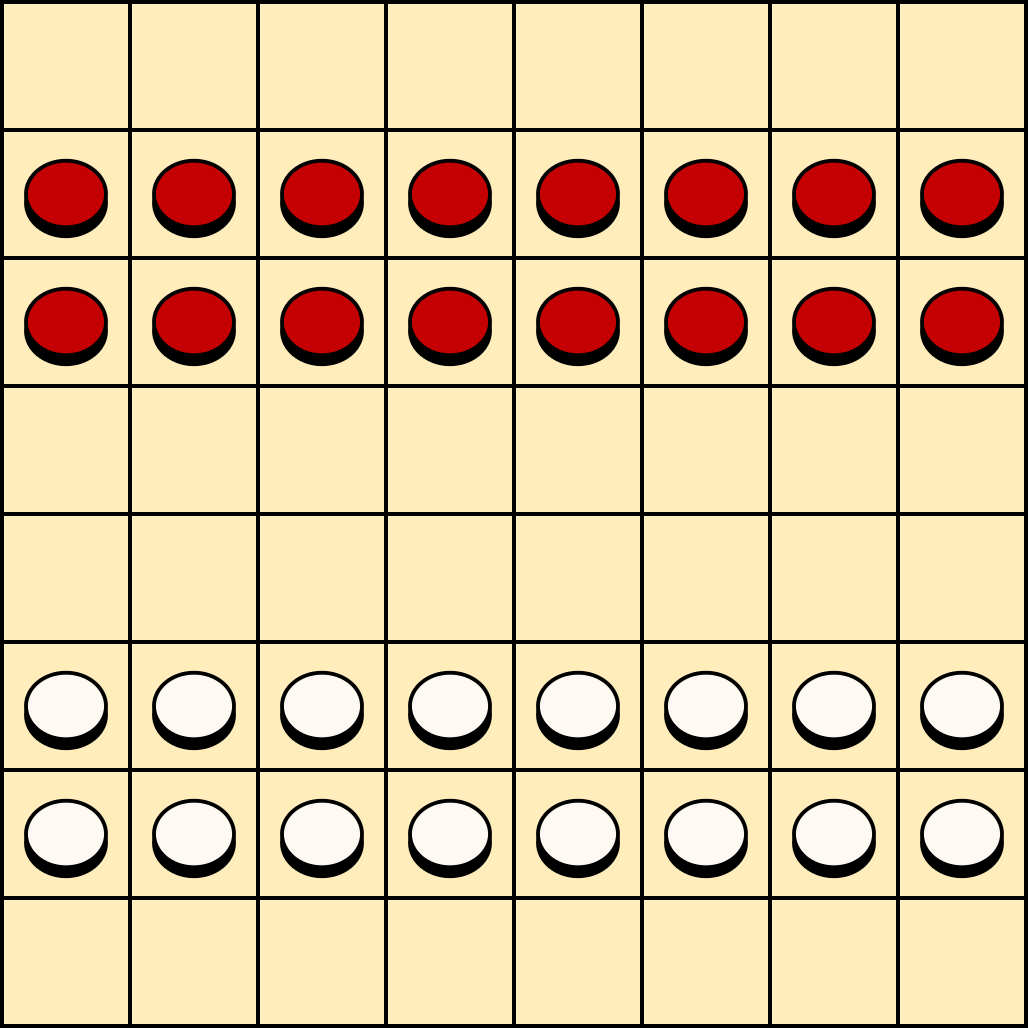
8×8 board, starting position in Turkish and Armenian draughts

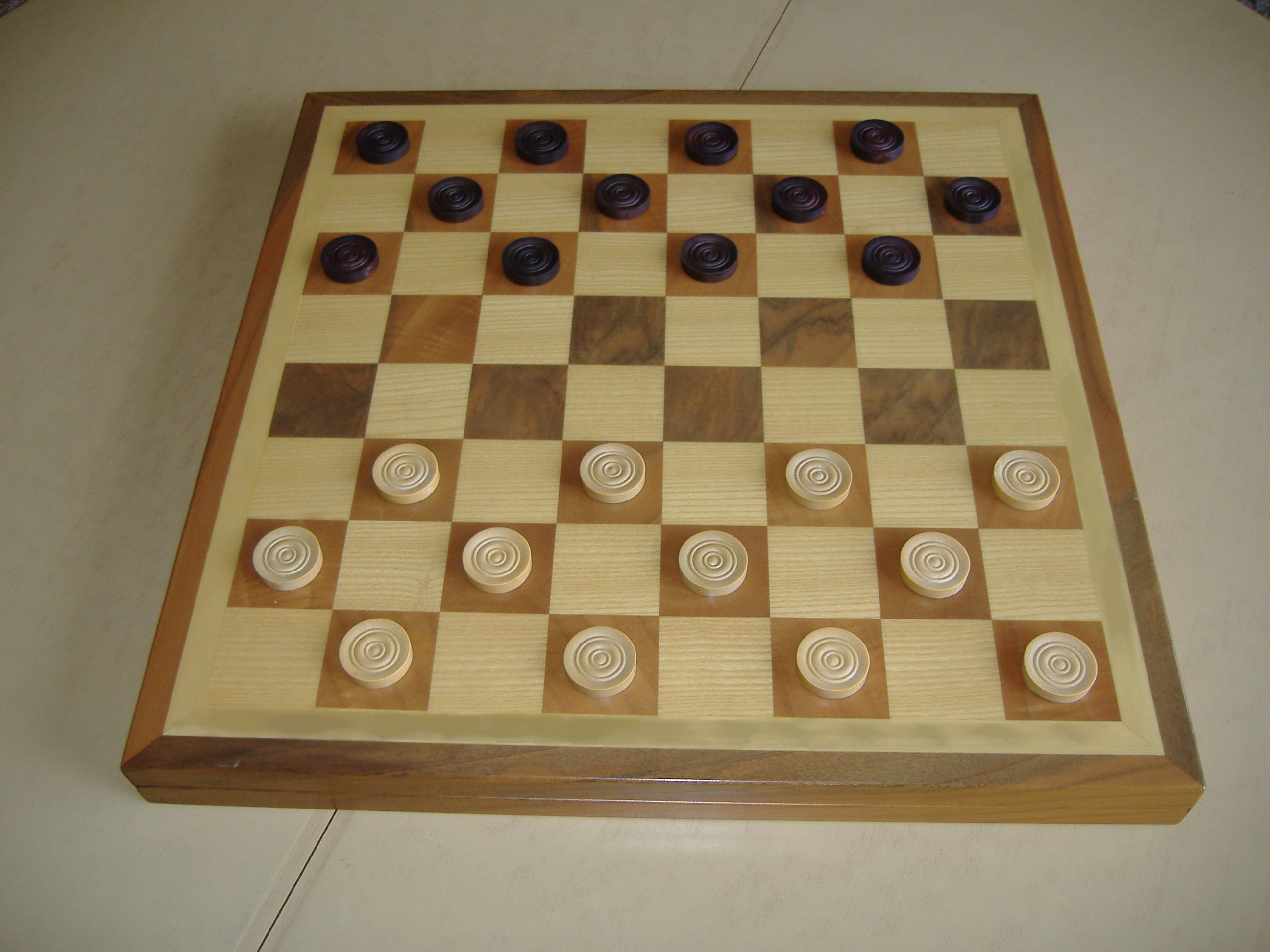
8×8 board, starting position in Italian and Portuguese draughts

8×8 board, starting position and example play in Bashni

=== Flying kings; men can capture backwards ===
International draughts / American Pool checkers family
| National variant | Board size | Pieces per side | Double-corner or light square on player's near-right? | First move | Capture constraints | Notes |
|---|---|---|---|---|---|---|
| International draughts (or Polish draughts) | 10×10 | 20 (originally, 15) | Yes | White | A sequence must capture the maximum possible number of pieces. | Pieces promote only when ending their move on the final rank, not when passing through it. It is mainly played in the Netherlands, Suriname, France, Belgium, some eastern European countries, some parts of Africa, some parts of the former USSR, and other European countries. |
| Ghanaian draughts (or damii) | 10×10 | 20 | No | White | Any sequence may be chosen, as long as all possible captures are made. Overlooking a king's capture opportunity leads to forfeiture of the king. | Played in Ghana. Having only a single piece remaining (man or king) loses the game. It is similar to 10×10 Czech Draughts, but has backwards capture and allows winning by removing all but one piece, similar to Latrunculi. |
| Frisian draughts | 10×10 | 20 | Yes | White | A sequence of capture must give the maximum "value" to the capture, and a king (called a wolf) has a value of less than two men but more than one man. If a sequence with a capturing wolf and a sequence with a capturing man have the same value, the wolf must capture. The main difference with the other games is that the captures can be made diagonally, but also straight forwards and sideways. | Played primarily in Friesland (Dutch province) historically, but in the last decade spreading rapidly over Europe (e.g. the Netherlands, Belgium, Italy, Czech Republic, Ukraine and Russia) and Africa, as a result of a number of recent international tournaments and the availability of an iOS and Android app "Frisian Draughts". Also most likely a descendant of German Englisch and Swedish Engelska via Swedish Marquere and Danish Makvar/Makvær. |
| Canadian checkers | 12×12 | 30 | Yes | White | A sequence must capture the maximum possible number of pieces. | International rules on a 12×12 board. Played mainly in Canada. |
| South African draughts | 14×14 | 42 | Yes | White | A sequence must capture the maximum possible number of pieces. | International rules on a 14×14 board. Played mainly in South Africa. |
| Brazilian draughts (or damas) (or Minor Polish draughts) | 8×8 | 12 | Yes | White | A sequence must capture the maximum possible number of pieces. | Played in Brazil. The rules come from international draughts, but board size and number of pieces come from American checkers. |
| Filipino Checkers (or dama) | 8×8 | 12 | Two variations exist: one with the double-corner on player's near-right and the other on player's near-left. | White | A sequence must capture the maximum possible number of pieces. | Played in the Philippines. Similar to Brazilian Draughts but with some specifics. Usually played on a dama matrix (crossed lined board representing only the diagonals) and comes in two orientations. |
| Pool checkers | 8×8 | 12 | Yes | Black | Any sequence may be chosen, as long as all possible captures are made. | Also called Spanish Pool checkers. It is mainly played in the southeastern United States; traditional among African American players. A man reaching the kings row is promoted only if he does not have additional backwards jumps (as in international draughts). In an ending with three kings versus one king, the player with three kings must win in thirteen moves or the game is a draw. |
| Jamaican draughts/checkers | 8×8 | 12 | No | Black | Any sequence may be chosen, as long as all possible captures are made. | Similar to Pool checkers with the exception of the main diagonal on the right instead of the left. A man reaching the kings row is promoted only if he does not have additional backwards jumps (as in international draughts). In an ending with three kings versus one king, the player with three kings must win in thirteen moves or the game is a draw. |
| Russian draughts | 8×8 | 12 | Yes | White | Any sequence may be chosen, as long as all possible captures are made. | Also called shashki or Russian shashki checkers. It is mainly played in the former USSR and in Israel. Rules are similar to international draughts, except: a man that enters the kings row during a jump and can continue to jump backwards, jumps backwards as a king, not as a man; choosing a sequence that captures the maximum possible number of pieces is not required.; There is also a 10×8 board variant (with two additional columns labeled i and k) and the give-away variant Poddavki. There are official championships for shashki and its variants. |
| Mozambican draughts/checkers | 8×8 | 12 | No | White | A sequence must capture the maximum possible number of pieces. Although, a king has the weight of two pieces, this means with two captures, one of a king and one of a piece, one must choose the king; two captures, one of a king and one of two pieces, the player can choose; two captures with one of a king and one of three pieces, the player must capture the three pieces; two captures, one of two kings and one of three pieces, one must choose the kings... | Also called "Dama" or "Damas". It is played along all of the region of Mozambique. In an ending with three kings versus one king, the player with three kings must win in thirteen moves or the game is a draw. |
| Kenyan checkers | 8×8 | 12 | Yes | White | Any sequence may be chosen, as long as all possible captures are made. | Kings (must capture in order to move multiple squares and) when they capture, must stop directly after the captured piece, and may begin a new capture movement from there. With this rule, there is no draw with two kings versus one, or even one versus one if the kings must capture in order to move multiple squares. |
| Tobit | 6×4 grid | 12 | —N/a | White | Mandatory Capture and Maximum Capture | Played on a unique non-rectangular or square board of grids with 20 grid points and 18 endpoints. Played in the Republic of Khakassia. Movement and capture is orthogonal with backwards capture. The "Tobit," a promoted piece, moves like the King in Turkish draughts. |
| Keny | 8×8 | 16 | —N/a | | Variable; Most rules have mandatory capture without maximum capture | Keny (Russian: Кены) is a draughts game played in the Caucasus and nearby areas of Turkey. It is played on an 8×8 grid with orthogonal movement. It is similar to Turkish Draughts, but has backwards capture and allows for men to jump over friendly pieces without capturing them similar to Dameo. |

=== Flying kings; men cannot capture backwards ===
Spanish draughts family
| National variant | Board size | Pieces per side | Double-corner or light square on player's near-right? | First move | Capture constraints | Notes |
|---|---|---|---|---|---|---|
| Spanish draughts | 8×8 | 12 | Light square is on right, but double corner is on left, as play is on the light squares. (Play on the dark squares with dark square on right is Portuguese draughts.) | White | A sequence must capture the maximum possible number of pieces, and the maximum possible number of kings from all such sequences. | Also called Spanish checkers. It is mainly played in Portugal, some parts of South America, and some Northern African countries. |
| Argentinian draughts | 8×8; 10×10 | 12; 15 | No | White | The rules are similar to the Spanish game, but a sequence that the king can capture must be captured first of all sequences of the same number of pieces. | The rules are similar to the Spanish game, but the king, when it captures, must stop directly after the captured piece, and may begin a new capture movement from there. With this rule, there is no draw with two kings versus one. |
| Malaysian/Singaporean checkers | 12×12 | 30 | Yes | Not fixed | Captures are mandatory. Failing to capture results in forfeiture of that piece (huffing). | Mainly played in Malaysia, Singapore, and the region nearby. Also known locally as "Black–White Chess". Sometimes it is played on an 8×8 board when a 12×12 board is unavailable; a 10×10 board is rare in this region. |
| Czech draughts Slovak draughts | 8×8; 10×10 | 12; 15 | Yes | White | If there are sequences of captures with either a man or a king, the king must be chosen. After that, any sequence may be chosen, as long as all possible captures are made. | This variant is from the family of the Spanish game. Slovak variant is occasionally mislabeled as Hungarian. |
| Hungarian Highlander draughts | 8×8 | 8 | | White | All pieces are long-range. Jumping is mandatory after first move of the rook. Any sequence may be chosen, as long as all possible captures are made. | The uppermost symbol of the cube determines its value, which is decreased after being jumped. Having only one piece remaining loses the game. |
| Thai draughts | 8×8 | 8 | Yes | Black | Any sequence may be chosen, as long as all possible captures are made. | During a capturing move, pieces are removed immediately after capture. Kings stop on the square directly behind the piece captured and must continue capturing from there, if possible, even in the direction where they come from. |
| German draughts (or Dame) | 8×8 | 12 | Yes | Black | Any sequence may be chosen, as long as all possible captures are made. In Germany, pieces may further be required to take the longest sequence. | Kings stop on the square directly behind the piece captured and must continue capturing from there as long as possible. Though called German, it is actually popular not so much in Northern Germany, but in Denmark and Finland. |
| Turkish draughts | 8×8 | 16 | —N/a | White | A sequence must capture the maximum possible number of pieces. Captured pieces are removed immediately so that a sequence may even continue in the direction where the capturing piece comes from | Also known as Dama. Men move straight forwards or sideways, instead of diagonally. When a man reaches the last row, it is promoted to a flying king (Dama), which moves like a rook (or a queen in the Armenian variant). The pieces start on the second and third rows. It is played in Turkey, Kuwait, Israel, Lebanon, Syria, Jordan, Greece, and several other locations in the Middle East, as well as in the same locations as Russian checkers. There are several variants in these countries, with the Armenian variant (called tama) allowing also forward-diagonal movement of men and the Greek requiring the king to stop directly after the captured piece. With this rule, there is no draw with one king and men versus one king. |
| Myanmar draughts | 8×8 | 12 | | White | A sequence must capture the maximum possible number of pieces. | Players agree before starting the game between "Must Capture" or "Free Capture". In the "Must Capture" type of game, a man that fails to capture is forfeited (huffed). In the "Free Capture" game, capturing is optional. |
| Tanzanian draughts | 8×8 | 12 | Yes | Not fixed | Any sequence may be chosen, as long as all possible captures are made. | |

=== No flying kings; men cannot capture backwards ===
American straight checkers / English draughts family
| National variant | Board size | Pieces per side | Double-corner or light square on player's near-right? | First move | Capture constraints | Notes |
|---|---|---|---|---|---|---|
| American checkers | 8×8; 10×10 | 12; 15; 20 | Yes | Black | Any sequence may be chosen, as long as all possible captures are made. | Also called "straight checkers" in the United States, or "English draughts" in the United Kingdom. |
| Italian draughts | 8×8; 10×10 | 12; 15; 20 | No | White | Men cannot jump kings. A sequence must capture the maximum possible number of pieces. If more than one sequence qualifies, the capture must be done with a king instead of a man. If more than one sequence qualifies, the one that captures a greater number of kings must be chosen. If there are still more sequences, the one that captures a king first must be chosen. | It is mainly played in Italy and some North African countries. Old French draughts is the same game without the obligation to jump kings with a king. Thus it was most likely first played in the Piedmont and the Aosta Valley, near the French border. This is possibly the same game as the Marella that Pietro Carrera mentions in passing in his Il Gioco degli scacchi (1617), notwithstanding a strange earlier reference to a Smarella played on an 8x6 checkered board with 12 pieces on a side. |
| Gothic checkers (or Altdeutsches Damespiel or Altdeutsche Dame) | 8×8 | 16 | —N/a | White | Captures are mandatory. | All 64 squares are used, dark and light. Men move one cell diagonally forward and capture in any of the five cells directly forward, diagonally forward, or sideways, but not backward. Men promote on the last row. Kings may move and attack in any of the eight directions. There is also a variant with flying kings. |

=== Russian Column draughts ===
Column draughts (Russian towers), also known as Bashni, is a kind of draughts known in Russia since the beginning of the nineteenth century and played according to the usual rules of Russian draughts but with the difference that the captured man is not removed from the playing field but is placed under the capturing piece (man or tower).

The resulting towers move around the board as a whole, "obeying" the upper piece. When taking a tower, only the uppermost piece is removed from it: and the resulting tower belongs to the player of the color of its new uppermost piece.

Bashni has inspired the games Lasca and Emergo.

== Championships ==
- World Checkers/Draughts Championship in American checkers since 1840
- Draughts World Championship in international draughts since 1885
- Women's World Draughts Championship in international draughts since 1873
- Draughts-64 World Championships since 1985

== Federations ==
- World Draughts Federation (FMJD) was founded in 1947 by four Federations: France, the Netherlands, Belgium and Switzerland.
- International Draughts Federation (IDF) was established in 2012 in Bulgaria.

== Games sometimes confused with checkers variants ==
- Halma: A game in which pieces move in any direction and jump over any other piece, friend or enemy (but with no captures), and players try to move them all into an opposite corner.
- Chinese checkers: Based on Halma, but uses a star-shaped board divided into equilateral triangles.
- Kōnane: "Hawaiian checkers".

== See also ==
- Chess
- Christopher Strachey's Checkers Program
- Fanorona
- List of draughts players
