= Tanzanian draughts =

Board game variant from Tanzania

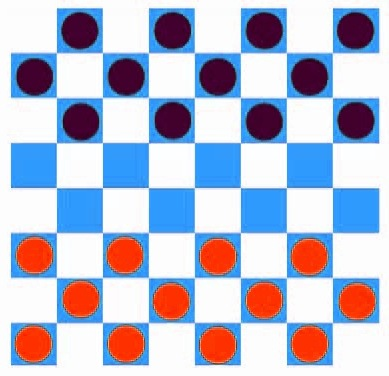
- Tanzanian draughts starting position
- Genres: Board game Abstract strategy game
- Players: 2
- Playing time: ~7 minutes
- Chance: None
- Skills: Strategy
- Synonyms: TZ draughts Drafti (in Swahili)

Tanzanian draughts (known as Drafti in Swahili) is a variant of the board game draughts (checkers) played in Tanzania. The game is similar to Czech draughts; however, unlike the Czech variant, there is no priority given to capturing with a king rather than a man. The starting position matches that of American checkers and Russian draughts (Shashki). Gameplay can be described as American checkers combined with the "flying king" found in Russian draughts.

== Game rules ==
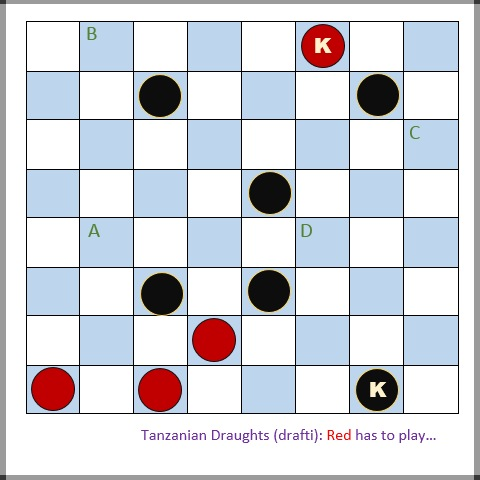
Captures are mandatory in Tanzanian draughts. The red man has two options: it can jump to position A or multi-jump to B; it cannot stop at D because further captures are available. Alternatively, Red can capture with the king to position C.

The game is played on an 8×8 board with alternating colored squares. The board is oriented so that the bottom-right corner is a light (or empty) square. Either player may move first, by mutual agreement.

The following rules apply to gameplay:

1. Men move diagonally forward by one square.
2. Men cannot capture backwards.
3. When a man reaches the furthest row (the opponent's kings row), it is promoted to a king.
4. Kings can move and capture diagonally forwards and backwards over any distance (flying kings).
5. Capturing is mandatory.
6. If a capture sequence is started, all available pieces in that sequence must be captured (including intersecting diagonals).
7. If multiple capture paths are available, the player may choose any valid path. There is no requirement to choose the path that captures the most pieces (longest jump), nor is there a priority for kings to capture over men.
8. Men can capture kings.

== Comparison with Russian draughts ==
Video demonstrating Tanzanian draughts gameplay.

Tanzanian draughts shares several similarities with Russian draughts: the board size, orientation, starting position, and the "flying king" mechanic are identical. In both games, capturing is mandatory.

However, there are distinct differences:

Tanzanian Draughts	Russian Draughts
Men never capture backwards.	Men can capture backwards.
If a man reaches the kings row during a capture sequence, the move ends there; it is promoted to a king and waits for the next turn to move as a king.	If a man reaches the kings row during a capture sequence, it is promoted immediately and continues capturing as a king in the same turn.

== Rules of competition ==
The Tanzania Draughts Federation (TDF) regulates standard rules and competitions. One of the TDF founders is O. Charles (Chief Kija).

While the federation establishes official laws, the following de facto rules are commonly used in competitions:

1. Touch-move: Once a valid move is made, it cannot be retracted.
2. Standard Draw: The game is a draw when each player has only one king remaining, or two kings against two kings.
3. Three Kings vs. One King: The game is not an immediate draw if one player has three kings (with at least one controlling the main diagonal) and the opponent has one king.
4. 12-Move Rule: In the scenario above (3 vs. 1), the player with three kings has 12 moves to win. If they fail to win within 12 moves, the game is declared a draw.
5. Forced Promotion: If a player has two kings and one man (controlling the main diagonal) against a lone king, the attacker may choose to promote the opponent's pieces to kings to create the 3 vs. 1 scenario and invoke the 12-move count.
6. Starting Rights: The winner of a match starts the next match. If a match is drawn, the player who did not start the previous game moves first.
7. Match Structure: A full competition consists of two matches. If the aggregate score is tied (e.g., one win each, or two draws), a tie-breaker match called limboti is played.
8. Tournament Format: Tournaments with more than three participants typically use a knockout format. Player rankings are often determined by the number of opponents eliminated.

== Optional rules ==
The following "house rules" are optional and based on player agreement:

1. Extended Count: In the 3 kings vs. 1 king scenario, players may agree to a different move limit (often 12) before a draw is called. This acknowledges that while winning is difficult, it is possible if the stronger side controls the main diagonal.
2. Supa: If a player wins the game without the opponent ever making a king, it is called a "supa" (Super). In some contexts, this is valued significantly higher (e.g., equal to 12 standard wins).
3. Piece Exchange: After each game, players swap pieces (colors).

== Opening moves ==
Common opening sequences (locally called "copies") include:

- Samba
- Sumu ya pandu
- Mabano
- Goma la kizee
- Pasati
- Kata mara mbili
- Mbuzi kavimba
- Tege
- Bana Mbavu
- Chotara
- Box

== See also ==
- Draughts
- World Checkers/Draughts Championship
- Bao
