= Philosophy shogi checkers =

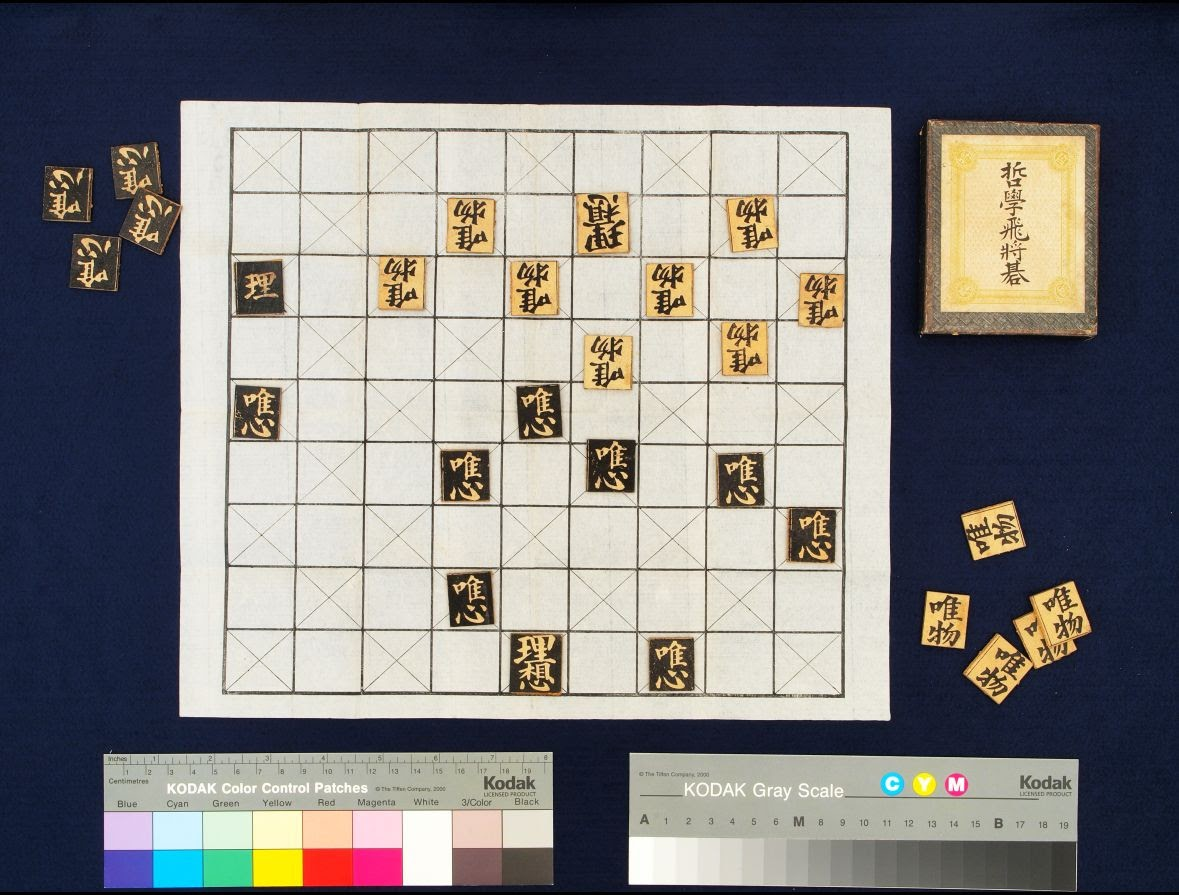
- Board and pieces (Toyo University)
- Years active: around 1890
- Genres: Board game
- Players: 2
- Setup time: < 60 seconds
- Chance: None
- Age range: 5+
- Skills: Tactics, Strategy

Philosophy shogi checkers (哲学飛将碁) is a board game similar to English draughts, invented by Inoue Enryō, Japanese philosopher, and described by his student in 1890. It has same board size with shogi and game ends with capturing the opponent's king, similar to shogi and Persian chess.

== Game play ==
Rules of the game are almost similar to English draughts. Differences from English draughts are explained here.

- Board - Size of the board is 9x9 with alternative dark and light squares, corner squares having dark colors. Pieces move in dark squares only.
- Pieces - Each player has 14 pieces; one of them is king.
- Starting position - At the starting position the pieces are placed at the dark squares of the first 3 rows closest to the players. King is placed at the center of the row closest to the player.
- How to move - Move and jump are similar to English draughts. Move and jump of the king are similar to king (crowned piece) of English draughts.
- Princes - If a player's piece moves into the first row on the opposing side of the board, the piece promotes to a "prince". Move and jump of prince are similar to king. To distinguish it from king at the starting position, it is called prince.
- How the game ends - A player wins by capturing opponent's king.

== See also ==
- English draughts
- Cheskers
- Dablot Prejjesne
- Chess variant
- Shogi
