= William Payne (mathematician) =

English mathematician

William Payne (unknown – c. 1779) was an English mathematician and the author of books about mathematics, draughts, and whist. Payne was the brother of prominent London bookseller Thomas Payne, who sold his works and published some of them.

Payne's first book, An Introduction to the Game of Draughts, was published in 1756. The dedication and preface were written by Samuel Johnson.

Payne's second book, An Introduction to Geometry: Containing the Most Useful Propositions in Euclid, & Other Authors, was published in 1767.

The book Maxims for Playing the Game of Whist; With All Necessary Calculations, and Laws of the Game was published anonymously in 1773; published by his brother Thomas, it is believed to have been written by William Payne.

== Sources ==
- Courtney, William Prideaux (1894). English whist and English whist players. Richard Bentley and Son.
- Courtney, William Prideaux; Smith, David Nichol (ed.) (1915). A bibliography of Samuel Johnson. Clarendon Press.
- Boswell, James (1888). The Life of Samuel Johnson. Swan Schonnenheim, Lowrey & Co.
- Hanley, Brian J (2001). Samuel Johnson as Book Reviewer: A Duty to Examine the Labors of the Learned. University of Delaware Press.
