= Cheskers =

Board game

Cheskers is a variant of checkers and chess invented by Solomon Golomb in 1948.

Position: b8 black upside-down knight, d8 black king, f8 black king, h8 black bishop, a7 black pawn, c7 black pawn, e7 black pawn, g7 black pawn, b6 black pawn, d6 black pawn, f6 black pawn, h6 black pawn, a3 white pawn, c3 white pawn, e3 white pawn, g3 white pawn, b2 white pawn, d2 white pawn, f2 white pawn, h2 white pawn, a1 white bishop, c1 white king, e1 white king, g1 white upside-down knight

Start position

Position: b8 black bishop, a7 black cross, c7 black cross, g7 black pawn, d6 black cross, f6 black circle, h6 black circle, a5 white circle, c5 white circle, e5 black cross, b4 white king, f4 white cross, h4 white cross, a3 white circle, c3 white circle, g3 black cross, d2 white cross, h2 black cross, g1 white upside-down knight

Moves without the capture. White can move the king to any of the four squares with a white dot, or the camel to any square with a white cross. Black can move the bishop to any of the squares with a black cross (as well as the f4-square), the black pawn can move to either of the squares with a black dot.

== Rules ==
=== Pieces ===
- Pawns move as pieces in checkers: they move, without taking, one square diagonally forward, but take by jumping two squares diagonally forward over an enemy piece to an empty square, thereby removing the enemy piece. Capturing of one or more pieces is mandatory.
- Kings move as a promoted checkers piece: this is the same type of move as a pawn in this game, but now the king can move and take also diagonally backwards. Capturing of one or more pieces is mandatory.
- The bishop moves and takes exactly as in normal chess. Capturing is not mandatory.
- The camel (Golomb called it the cook) has a kind of extended knight's move: it goes one diagonal and two straight. With this move, it can jump over other pieces (like a knight jumps), but the camel takes by moving to the square on which the enemy piece is located. Capturing is not mandatory.

=== Promotion ===
When a pawn reaches the last row of the board its move is ended, and the pawn can promote to king, bishop or camel.

=== Starting position ===
- White: Kings c1, e1; Bishop a1; Camel g1; pawns a3, b2, c3, d2, e3, f2, g3, h2.
- Black: Kings d8, f8, Bishop h8; Camel b8; pawns a7, b6, c7, d6, e7, f6, g7, h6.

Black moves first.

=== Victory conditions ===
The player that captures all opponent's kings (even promoted ones) wins the game. Also, a player that is stalemated (cannot move) loses the game.
