= Canadian checkers =

Variant of draughts on a 12x12 board

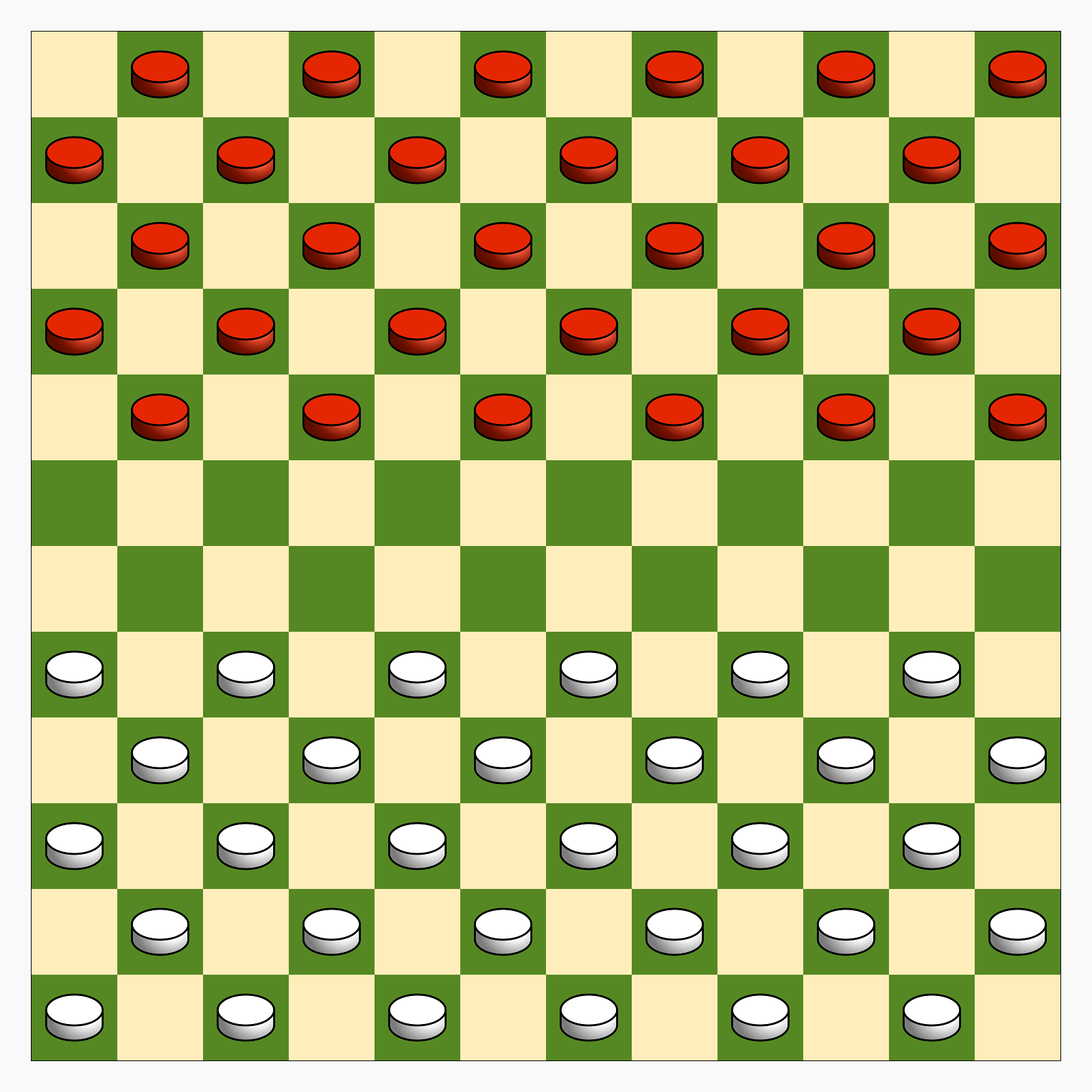
- Canadian checkers board and starting setup; White moves first.
- Years active: at least 250 years
- Genres: Board game; Abstract strategy game; Mind sport
- Players: 2
- Setup time: < 1 minute
- Playing time: 30 minutes – 4 hours
- Chance: None
- Skills: Strategy, tactics
- Synonyms: Canadian draughts

Canadian checkers (or Canadian draughts) is a variant of the strategy board game draughts. It is one of the largest draughts games, played on a 12×12 checkered board with 30 game pieces per player.

== History ==
The game was invented by the French settlers of Quebec, Canada; it was named Grand jeu de dames. It is unknown when the game was first played in Canada. The huff rule (Note: "The penalty for failing to capture when able to do so varies. Traditionally, the opponent may, before making his own move, capture any opposing piece (but not more than one) that could have captured but didn't. This is known as 'huffing', as it is traditional to indicate the fact by taking up the defaulting piece and blowing on it (French souffler, German blasen, Spanish soplar, Italian soffiare, etc.) before laying it aside. In most countries, huffing has been abolished from modern tournament play, and a move made instead of a capture must be rescinded and replaced by the capture. In some versions, the opponent may either insist on the capture or accept the non-capturing move as valid. Rarely, players agree to waive compulsory capture.") was dropped in 1880 after a dispute developed during the Canadian championship match.

The idea of an increased-size international draughts game is older still; boards with 12×12 squares were on sale in London in 1805.

== Game rules ==
Canadian checkers follows the same rules and conventions as international draughts, the only differences are the larger gameboard (12×12 squares instead of 10×10), and more checkers per player (30 instead of 20). The starting setup is shown in the diagram.

== Notation ==
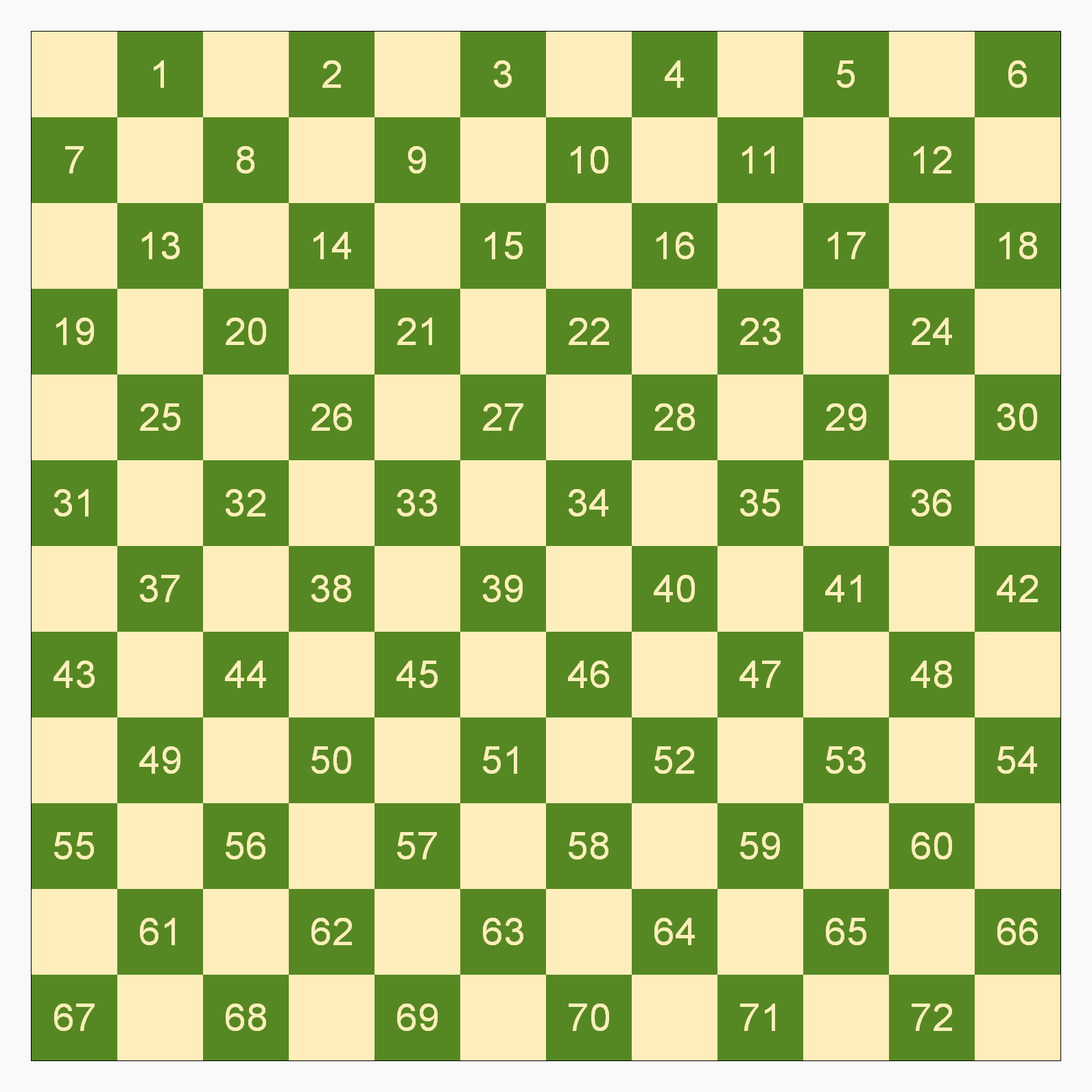
Square IDs for game notation

Games are recorded using the same method of notation used by other draughts variants, extended for a board of 144 squares (see diagram).

== See also ==
- Hexdame – international draughts rules applied to a hexagonal board
