= Czech draughts =

Variant of checkers / draughts

Czech draughts is a board game traditionally played in the regions formerly comprising Czechoslovakia (now known as Czech Republic and Slovakia). It is governed by the Czech Draughts Federation.

== Game rules ==
	1		2		3		4
5		6		7		8
	9		10		11		12
13		14		15		16
	17		18		19		20
21		22		23		24
	25		26		27		28
29		30		31		32

starting position in Czech draughts

The draughtsboard consists of eight ranks and eight files. Each player starts with twelve draughtsmen arranged on opposite sides of the board, positioned on black squares in three rows. Pieces move one square diagonally forward. When a piece reaches the furthest rank from its owner, it is promoted to a king. Kings can move any number of squares diagonally forward or backward.

A player loses if they cannot make a move, either due to losing all their pieces or having no legal moves remaining. The game is declared a draw if it becomes theoretically impossible (i.e., with perfect play) to capture any of the opponent's pieces.

=== Capture rules ===
- Captures are mandatory in Czech draughts. If a piece is adjacent to an opposing piece with an empty position behind it, the player must move to that empty position and remove the opposing piece from the board.
- If a player can capture with either a piece or a king, they must use the king to do so.
- If multiple captures are possible, the player may choose to capture either one piece or the entire line; partial line captures are not allowed. When multiple captures occur, all captured pieces are removed from the board simultaneously once the capture sequence is complete.
- Players cannot capture their own pieces.

=== Variant ===
A misere variant of the game exists, where the goal is to lose all of one's pieces.

== Regional differences ==
Although Czech draughts is a regional variant of draughts, the version played in the Slovak Republic differs slightly. In the Slovak variant, each player starts with only two ranks of pieces, and the "huffing" rule is enforced: if a player fails to make a required capture, the opponent may capture that piece before making their own move. Additionally, if a player has no legal moves but still has pieces on the board, the game is declared a draw. This variant is specific to Slovakia (Slovak Republic) and is likely played primarily by children.

== See also ==
- International draughts
- English draughts
- Pool checkers
- Russian checkers
- Italian draughts
- Turkish draughts
- Draughts
- Tanzanian draughts
