= Thai traditional games =

Integral games of Thailand

Thai traditional games (Thai: การละเล่นพื้นบ้าน) have been an integral part of Thai culture and traditions since ancient times. The Sukhothai period marked the earliest known traditional games in Thailand, as recorded in the stone inscription of King Ramkhamhaeng. Since then, Thai traditional games have evolved and been adapted over time, leading to the development of a wide variety of games across different eras. These games were originally designed to foster good relationships between adults and young people, as well as to provide entertainment, relaxation, and exercise. They are played with a set of rules and often feature music or songs to enhance the experience. Moreover, many traditional Thai games incorporate natural items such as sand, bamboo, rattan, mud balls, or banana tree stems, etc.

== Children's games ==
=== Chak Ka Yer ===
Chak Ka Yer (Thai: ชักเย่อ) is a Tug of war game. The game is played with two teams of equal number of participants, who pull on opposite ends of a rope. The objective is to pull the other team across a marked center line. There are no time limits or weight restrictions, and the winning team is the one that successfully pulls the other team across the line.

=== Deed Luk Kaew ===
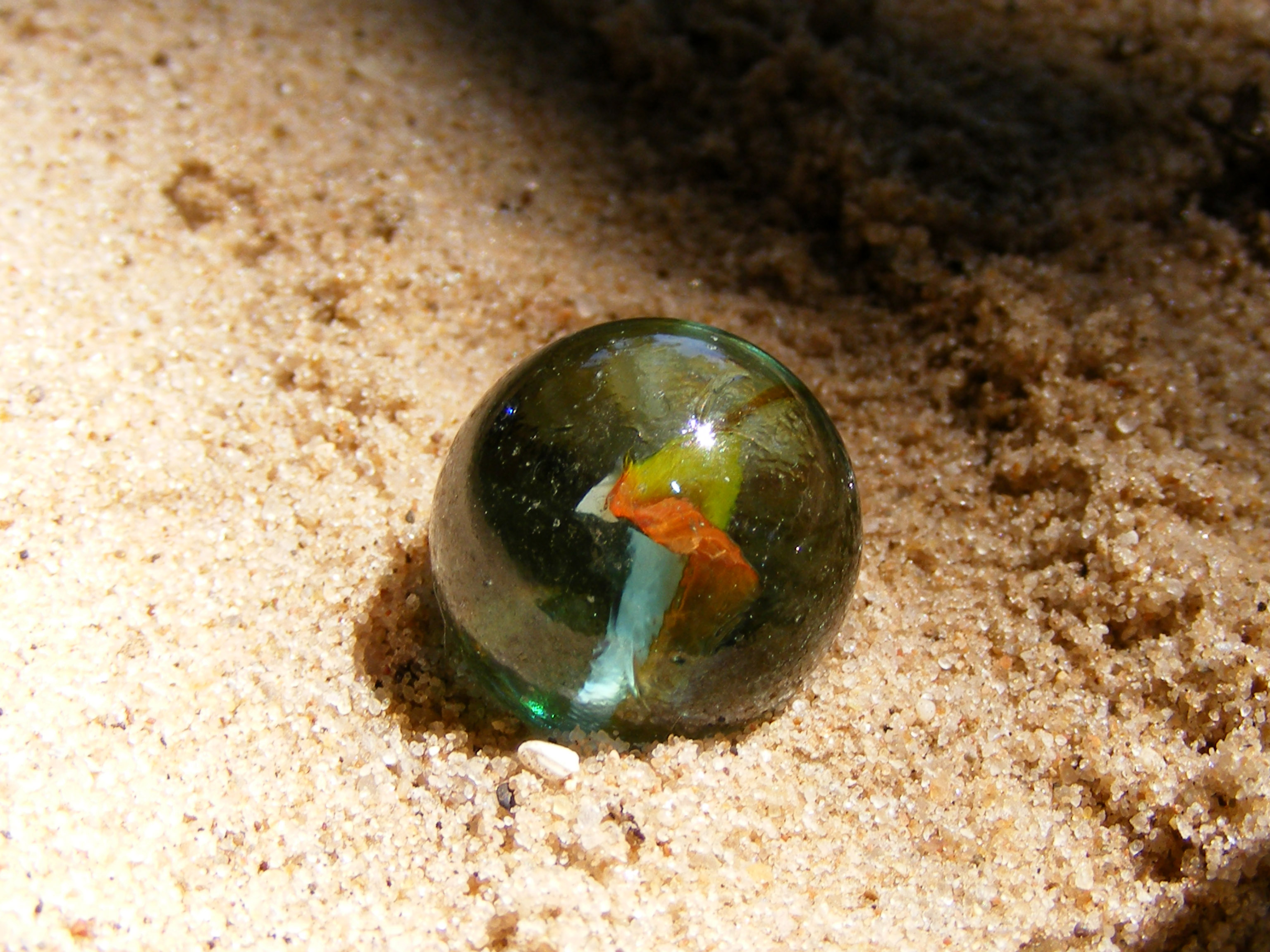
An orange and white toothpaste marble

Deed Luk Kaew (Thai: ดีดลูกแก้ว) is a Thai marble game that can be played with just 2 people or more. The game starts with players setting up a small area on the ground or on a table, usually with a circle drawn using chalk or a marker. The objective of the game is to knock the opponent's marbles out of the circle by using one's own marbles. Each player takes turns shooting their marbles into the circle, and the player who successfully knocks out all of their opponent's marbles wins.

=== Dern Kala ===
Dern Kala (Thai: เดินกะลา) is a game that involves walking on coconut shells. Players use two cleaned coconut shells with a hole drilled in the middle for stringing a rope, about 1 meter long. The rope is tied tightly to prevent the shells from falling off while walking. The objective of the game is to walk to the finish line without falling off the shells. The game helps to train balance and develop body strength, while also providing fun for players.

=== Jam Jee ===
Jam Jee (Thai: จ้ำจี้) is a finger guessing game played by sitting in a circle with both hands overturned on the floor. One person becomes the leader and uses their index finger to touch the other players' fingers one by one while singing. When the singing ends, the person whose finger was touched must fold that finger. The game continues until one player folds all their fingers, and they are declared the loser.

=== Ka Fak Khai ===
Ka Fak Khai (Thai: กาฟักไข่) is a game where players gather materials to make eggs and place them in the center of a circle. One player is chosen to be the guard of the eggs while others try to steal them without getting caught. If a player successfully grabs an egg, they get to keep it. If not, they must become the next guard. The game also includes a guessing element where the guard must find hidden eggs and guess how many are hidden. If all eggs are stolen without getting caught, the guard is blindfolded and asked to find a hidden egg.

=== Khee Ma Kan Kluay ===
Khee Ma Kan Kluay (Thai: ขี่ม้าก้านกล้วย) is a game where children play with a toy horse made out of banana stalks. The game was popular in the past and provided a way for children to exercise and play together. While adults often helped make the toy horse, children would play with them by hunching over and jumping like a running horse. The game sometimes involves elements of competition, such as racing or pretend fighting with weapons. Today, efforts are being made to preserve this folk game, with performances at traditional events and festivals for future generations to experience.

=== Khee Ma Song Muang ===
Khee Ma Song Muang (Thai: ขี่ม้าส่งเมือง, lit. 'Riding horse to send to the city') is a traditional riding game. The objective of the game is for players to ride on each other's backs, with no limit to the number of players, although 20 players make the game more enjoyable. The players are divided into two equal parties, and one or two players act as governors who sit in the center. To determine the winning side, players toss a coin or catch a long stick. The first whisperer of the winning side whispers something agreed upon, and the other party comes out and whispers the name of a player from the winning side. If the player whose name was whispered is the one who comes out, the governor says "Pong," and the player becomes the loser, carrying the winner on their back to the original place. Alternatively, players may agree that the losing player will be thumbed captive, and the winning side will guess again until all players have run out. The side with the remaining players wins by riding on the back of the losing player to the city.

=== Kradod Chueak ===
Kradod Chueak (Thai: กระโดดเชือก) is a jump rope game. There are two ways to play: individual jump rope and group jump rope. Tricks can also be added to the jumps, and there are various techniques. In individual jump rope, the player holds the rope with both hands, swings it faster and faster until the rope is almost invisible. This method requires a long rope. In group jump rope, two players hold the ends of the rope and swing it up and down to create a rhythm. Players take turns jumping over the rope to the rhythm of the swing, being careful not to get stuck on the rope. After ten jumps, they switch to the next player.

=== Kratai Khadeaw ===
Kratai Khadeaw (Thai: กระต่ายขาเดียว, lit. 'One-legged rabbit') is a traditional Thai children's game that involves 6-10 players in a square-shaped playing area. One player is chosen to be the rabbit and must stand on one leg to catch the other players as they try to escape within the rectangular area. If the rabbit touches a player, they become a rabbit too. To adapt the game for larger groups, the number of rabbits can be increased and the play area adjusted. A small circle can be added for the rabbit to rest or change legs. An alternative rule can be implemented where a fleeing player touched by the rabbit must stay still until another fleeing player touches them to free them.

=== Len Son Ha ===
Len Son Ha (Thai: เล่นซ่อนหา) or Pong Pae (Thai: โป้งแปะ) is a traditional Thai hide-and-seek game. The rules are simple: one person is chosen to be the "Seeker" or "Hider", and they close their eyes and count while the other players hide. The Hiders used to have to say "Close your eyes, don't peek, harmful toxins enter your eyes, parents can make rice with just one grain" before running off to hide. Once the Seeker thinks everyone is hidden, they will ask "Ready or not?" When the Hiders respond "Ready!" the Seeker will go find their friends. If the Seeker finds a Hider, they will say "Pong" followed by the name of the person found. The Seeker can also call out "Pong" to someone they see in the distance. The game continues until all the Hiders are found, and the first person found then becomes the next Seeker. However, if the Seeker is unable to find someone, that person can come out of hiding and touch the Seeker while saying "Pae," allowing them to continue hiding.

=== Len Wao ===
Len Wao (Thai: เล่นว่าว) is the Thai term for kite flying, a traditional activity enjoyed by both children and adults in Thailand. Evidence suggests that kites have been popular in Thailand for centuries, with historical records from Sukhothai and Ayutthaya periods. Today, kite flying is still enjoyed in various regions of Thailand, with different styles and designs of kites being popular in different areas. Kite flying can be enjoyed by simply flying the kite in the wind, or by skillfully maneuvering it to create a beautiful and melodious display in the sky.

=== Luk Khang ===
Luk Khang (Thai: ลูกข่าง) is a traditional Thai toy that was popular among children in the past. It is a spinning top made of guava or teak and has a round, oval shape with a big head and small butt like a guava. At the bottom, a spigot emerges, which initially had a simple form but was later invented, created, and developed in different varieties, some of which produce a sound when turning. To play, the ball is wrapped in a rope and thrown by quickly twitching the rope from the core, making the ball rotate well.

=== Mak Kep ===
Mak Kep (Thai: หมากเก็บ, lit. 'Pebbles tossing and picking') is a traditional Thai children's game that involves collecting small objects in a specific sequence. It can be played by individuals or divided into two equal teams. The game requires players to throw and catch small objects while following specific rules, such as not touching other pieces during the throw-up steps and picking up the correct number of small objects in each step. While the game has evolved over time and is now often played with plastic chains, it originally used stones.

=== Mon Son Pha ===
Mon Son Pha (Thai: มอญซ่อนผ้า, lit. 'Mon hides the cloth') is a traditional Thai children's game that has been played for centuries. It is typically played by both boys and girls and requires at least 5 players. The players sit in a circle and sing a background song while one player, called the "Mon", hides a doll cloth behind them. The other players must be careful not to be hit by the cloth.Despite its name, Mon Son Pha is not a game that is traditionally played by the Mon people as a cultural group. The Mon people have a cultural taboo against playing with dolls or wrapping them in ghost cloth, which has been ordered down through generations. However, the game may have been influenced by cultural exchange between the Mon and Thai people. It is not commonly associated with Mon culture, but has been passed down through generations in various parts of Thailand and is often played during the Songkran festival, which marks the Thai New Year.

=== Ri Ri Khao San ===
Ri Ri Khao San (Thai: รีรีข้าวสาร) is a hand-holding game that involves two players facing each other and raising their hands like a gate. Other players stand behind the gate and try to pass through it while the gatekeepers chant a traditional song. The game requires quick reflexes and teamwork, making it a fun activity for children to play together.

=== Seua Kham Huai ===
Seua Kham Huai (Thai: เสือข้ามห้วย) is a game that involves two teams, tigers and creeks. The tigers try to jump over the creeks who do various poses, while the creeks try to prevent them from successfully jumping. The game can be played solo or in groups and has two methods of playing. If a tiger fails to jump over a creek, their team must switch to being creeks.

=== Tang Te ===
Tang Te (Thai: ตั้งเต) or Jong Te (Thai: จ้องเต) is a game that is similar to hopscotch. It is usually played by children and consists of a grid drawn on the ground, with various designs and patterns. The game involves hopping on one foot through the different squares, while avoiding stepping on the lines and keeping balance. The aim of the game is to reach the end of the grid, and then return to the starting point, without making any mistakes.

=== Wing Preaw ===
Wing Preaw (Thai: วิ่งเปี้ยว) is a running game that requires speed and strength. Players are divided into two equal teams with at least four players per team. The objective is to run around the opposing team's flag pole, then run back and pass a piece of cloth to the next player on their own team. Players try to avoid being hit by their opponents and chase them down to end the game.

== Board games ==
=== Makruk ===
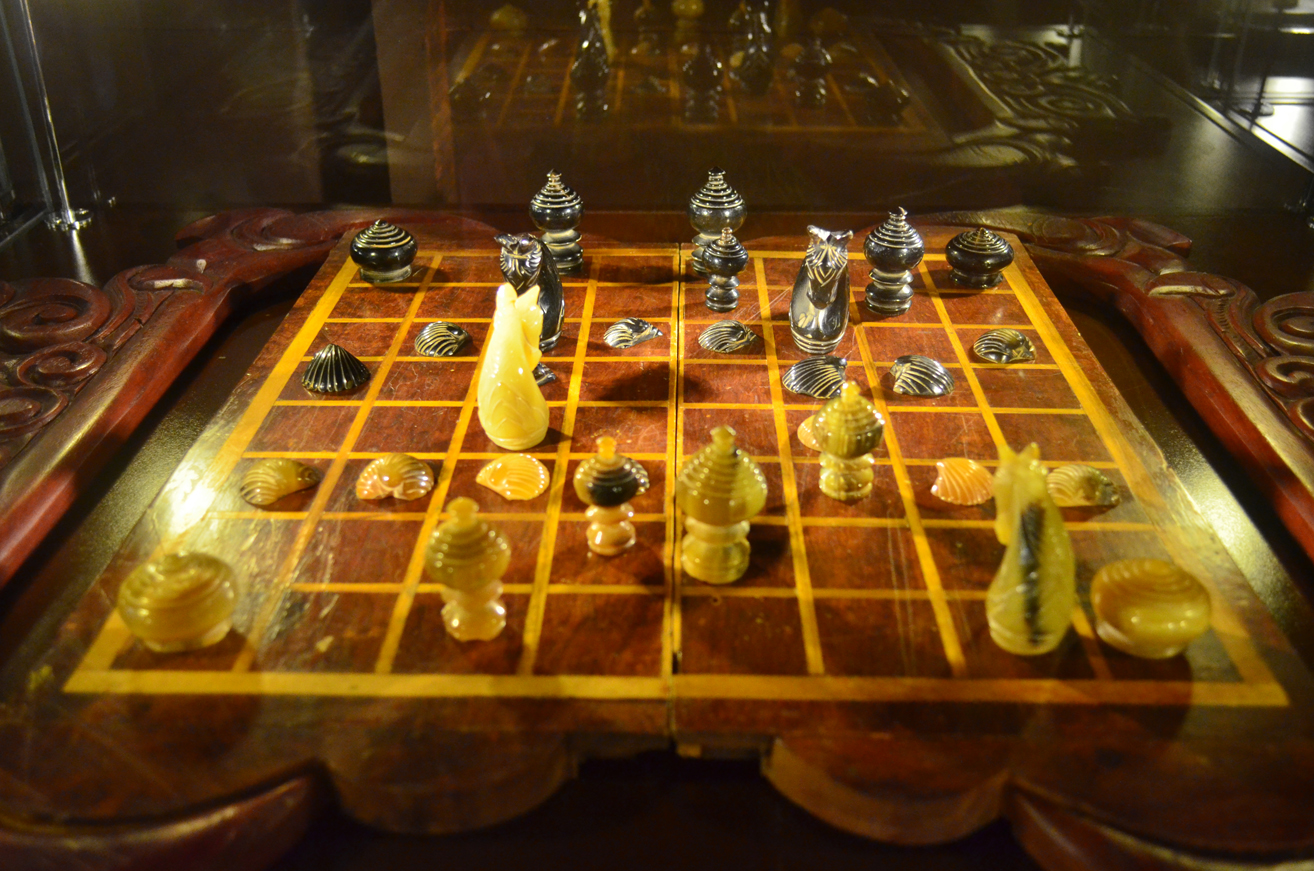
Makruk board from the early Rattanakosin period.

Makruk (Thai: หมากรุก) is a traditional Thai board game that is similar to chess. It is played on an 8x8 board with pieces that represent various military units, such as elephants, horses, and boats. The objective of the game is to capture the opponent's king by placing it in checkmate, just like in chess. Makruk is known for its complex strategy and has been played in Thailand for hundreds of years. It is a popular pastime among locals, especially in rural areas where it is often played in outdoor markets or on the street. In recent years, efforts have been made to promote Makruk as a national sport, and it has gained popularity both domestically and internationally.

=== Makyek ===
Makyek (Thai: หมากแยก) is an abstract strategy board game played on an 8x8 square board with 16 pieces per player, where players move their pieces like the rook in chess and attempt to capture their opponent's pieces through custodian and intervention capture. Unlike chess, Makyek only has one type of piece, the rook, and players can only move their pieces horizontally or vertically.

=== Makhos ===
Makhos (Thai: หมากฮอส) is a Thai version of checkers that is played on an 8x8 square board by two players. Each player starts with 8 pieces, which are placed at opposite ends of the board. The game follows rules similar to international checkers, but with some variations. For example, kings can move diagonally in any direction, not just one space, and can continue capturing in any direction from the square directly behind the captured piece.

== Boat racing ==
=== Khaeng Ruea Yao ===
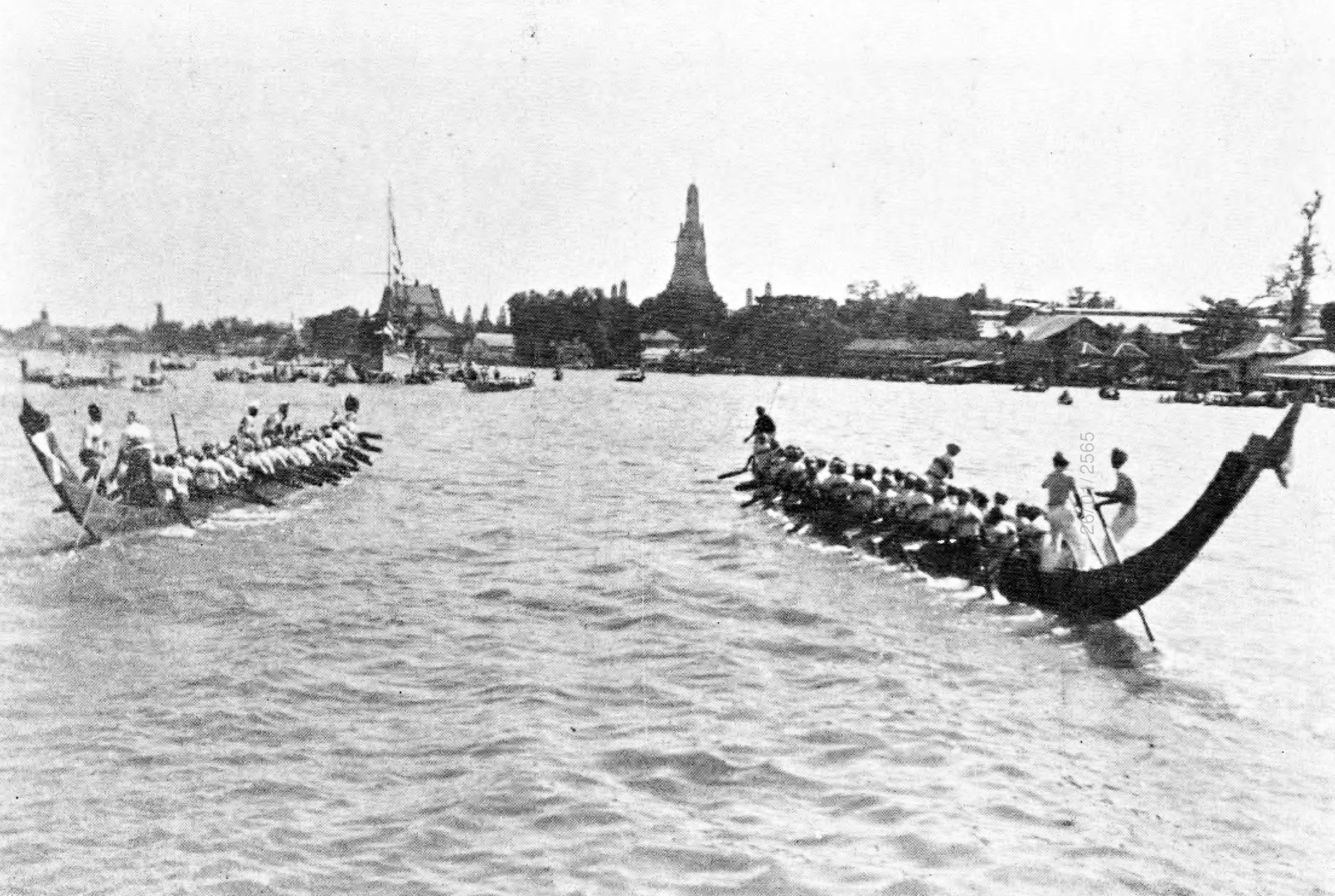
A photograph taken in 1943 shows a long boat race taking place on the Chao Phraya River in Thailand.

Khaeng Ruea Yao (Thai: แข่งเรือยาว, lit. 'Long-boat racing') is a boat racing in Thailand that has been practiced for centuries. The boats used in this race are long and narrow, and can be up to 30 meters in length with a crew of up to 50 people. The boats are decorated with intricate designs and colors that represent the different regions of Thailand. The race is typically held during the rainy season, between July and October, and is often accompanied by traditional music and dancing. The race is a display of strength, endurance, and teamwork as the boats compete to be the first to cross the finish line. Long-boat racing is not only a sport but also an important cultural event that brings communities together to celebrate their heritage and traditions.

== Ball games ==
=== Pétanque ===
A French game, is also played in Thailand, where it is pronounced BeTang (Thai, เปตอง).

=== Len Saba ===
Len Saba (Thai: เล่นสะบ้า) is a game played with a unique ball made from the seeds of the Entada rheedei plant. The game is also associated with the Mon people of Thailand. Players are divided into two teams and take turns being the pitching and receiving sides. The objective is to toss the ball as far as possible, with players walking or running to stop each other's tosses. Points are earned by the pitching team if the receiving team fails to catch the ball. The game continues until a certain number of points are earned or a time limit is reached. The game requires skill in throwing the ball and the ability to dodge to stop opponent's tosses, with moves such as the patella wheel or patella flick used to score points.

=== Takraw ===
Takraw (Thai: ตะกร้อ) is a traditional Thai ball games that dates back to the Ayutthaya period. Initially played without a net, it involved passing a rattan ball to another person using only the feet, knees, chest, and head, without letting it touch the ground. In the 1940s, the introduction of the net gave rise to a new form of the game that is now widely played in Thailand and other Southeast Asian countries. A standard game of Takraw involves two teams of three players each, although the number of players can vary depending on the specific variation being played. Takraw has many variations, including Takraw Wong Lek (Thai: ตะกร้อวงเล็ก, lit. 'Small Circle Takraw'), Takraw Wong Yai (Thai: ตะกร้อวงใหญ่, lit. 'Big Circle Takraw'), Takraw Pliek Pheuang (Thai: ตะกร้อพลิกแพลง, lit. 'Bending Takraw'), Takraw Ching Thong (Thai: ตะกร้อชิงธง, lit. 'Capture the Flag Takraw'), Takraw Kham Ta Khai (Thai: ตะกร้อข้ามตาข่าย, lit. 'Crossover Net Takraw'), and Takraw Lod Huang (Thai: ตะกร้อลอดห่วง, lit. 'Hoop Takraw'). Each variation has its own unique rules and playing style, adding to the excitement and challenge of the game. Takraw is not only a popular pastime in Thailand but also a form of exercise that helps improve flexibility.

== See also ==
- Sport in Thailand
- Video games in Thailand
