= Frisian draughts =

Discipline of draughts

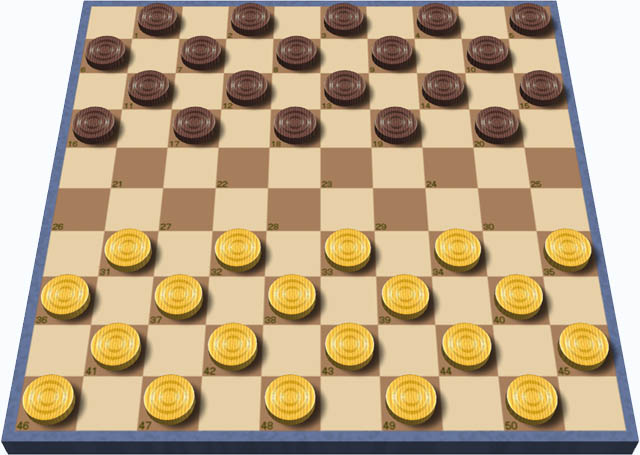

Frisian draughts is a variant of draughts native to Friesland in the Netherlands. The rules are similar to International draughts, but is notable for its unique feature of allowing for orthogonal captures (up, down, left, right) in addition to the familiar diagonal capture of most draughts variants.

== Rules ==
=== Starting position ===
- The game is played on a board with 10x10 squares, alternatingly dark and light. The lower-leftmost square should be dark.
- Each player has 20 pieces. In the starting position the pieces are placed on the black squares of the first four rows closest to the players. This leaves two central rows empty.

=== Moves ===
- The player with the light pieces moves first. Then turns alternate.
- Ordinary pieces move one square diagonally forward to an unoccupied square.

=== Crowning ===
- A piece is crowned if it stops on the far edge of the board at the end of its turn (that is, not if it reaches the edge but must then jump another piece backward). Another piece is placed on top of it to mark it. Crowned pieces, called kings, can move freely multiple steps in any diagonal direction.
- A king may only move three times in a row unless it makes a capture. Otherwise the player must move another piece. If the player has only kings on the board this rule does not apply.

=== Captures ===
- Enemy pieces can and must be captured by jumping over the enemy piece, two squares forward or backward to an unoccupied square immediately beyond in any direction (a choice of eight) along the horizontal, vertical and diagonal lines. If a jump is possible it must be done, even if doing so incurs a disadvantage.
  - Multiple successive jumps forwards, backwards, or sideways in a single turn can and must be made if after each jump there is an unoccupied square immediately beyond the enemy piece. It is compulsory to make the highest shot value. Each king is worth a man and a half. If there are two opportunities for shots, one with two men, and the other with a man and a king, the player must capture the man and the king because it has a value of two and a half men. If a man or a king can make a shot of equal value, the king must make the shot, otherwise the piece that can make the highest value shot, must be used.
  - A king may capture an opponent piece in any direction any distance away so long as there is an empty space behind the piece to be captured. The king may choose any empty space beyond the captured piece not blocked by other pieces, but must still make the highest value shot possible.
  - A jumped piece is removed from the board at the end of the turn. (So for a multi-jump move, jumped pieces are not removed during the move, they are removed only after the entire multi-jump move is complete.)
  - The same piece may not be jumped more than once.

=== Winning and draws ===
- A player with no valid move remaining loses. This occurs if the player has no pieces left, or if all the player's pieces are obstructed from moving by opponent pieces.
- In a game where one player has two kings and the other one king, the player with two kings must win within seven moves or the game is declared a draw.
- A king-versus-king endgame is automatically declared a draw when neither king is able to make a shot on their next turn.

== History ==
In 2020, the very first candidate tournament in Frisian draughts, the Fryslan Open, was held with competitors from Russia, Belarus, Ukraine, Czech Republic, Italy, Belgium and the Netherlands. Many notable International draughts players, such as Alexander Georgiev, 2019 International Draughts World Champion, and Alexander Schwartzman, who would later become the 2021 International Draughts World Champion, joined to earn the right to face off against the 2018 Frisian draughts world champion Marten Walingsa. Folkert Groenveld, a Friesland native, won the Open, defeating all contenders unexpectedly and earning the right to challenge for the championship title. He later lost to Marten Walinga in the 2021 world championship match in Harlingen, Netherlands, defeating him in two games, but losing or drawing the rest of the matches.

== See also ==
- Draughts
- International Draughts
- Turkish Draughts
- Dameo
- Friesland
- Netherlands
