= Italian draughts =

Board game

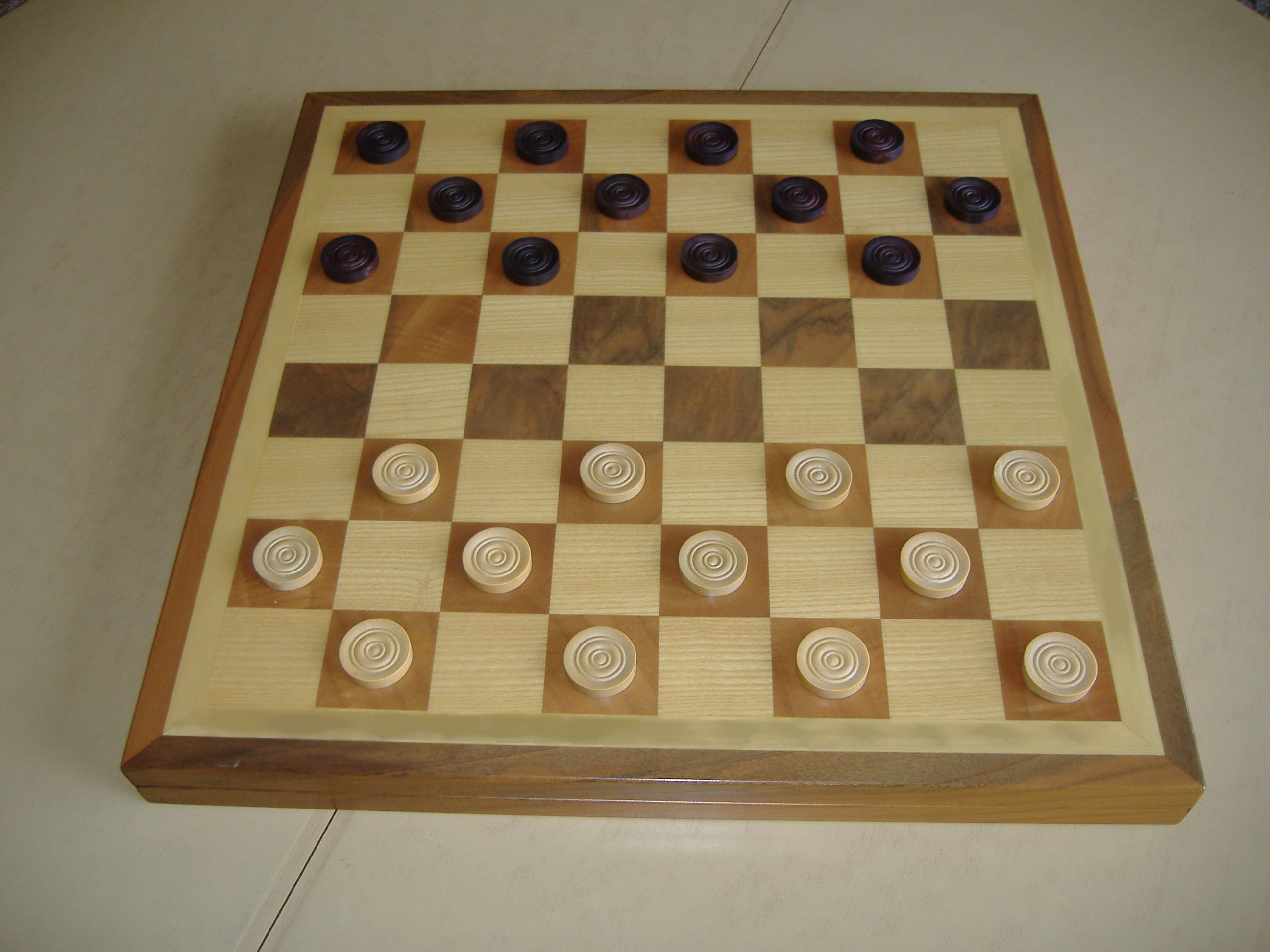
Draughts board in Italian draughts

Italian draughts (Italian: Dama italiana) is a variant of the draughts family played mainly in Italy and Northern Africa. It is a two-handed game played on a board consisting of sixty-four squares, thirty-two white and thirty-two black. There are twenty-four pieces: twelve white and twelve black. The board is placed so that the rightmost square on both sides of the board is black.

The Italian Championship has been held annually since 1925. The first World Championship, won by Damiano Sciuto, was held in 2024.

== Capturing ==
A number of rules apply to captures in Italian draughts, whether by men or kings; this tends to make Italian draughts a game where many mistakes can be made.

- If a player has a king, the other player must take it with his own king.
- If a player is faced with the prospect of choosing which captures to make, the first and foremost rule to obey is to capture the greatest quantity of pieces.
- If a player may capture an equal number of pieces with either a man or king, he must do so with the king.
- If a player may capture an equal number of pieces with a king, in which one or more options contain a number of kings, he must capture the greatest number of kings possible.
- If a player may capture an equal number of pieces (each series containing a king) with a king, he must capture wherever the king occurs first.
- If none of these rules apply to the situation at hand, the player may choose according to his tactical requirements.

== See also ==
- International draughts
- English draughts
- Pool checkers
- Russian checkers
- Czech draughts
- Turkish draughts
- Draughts
