= 2017 World Draughts Championship =

Draughts tournament

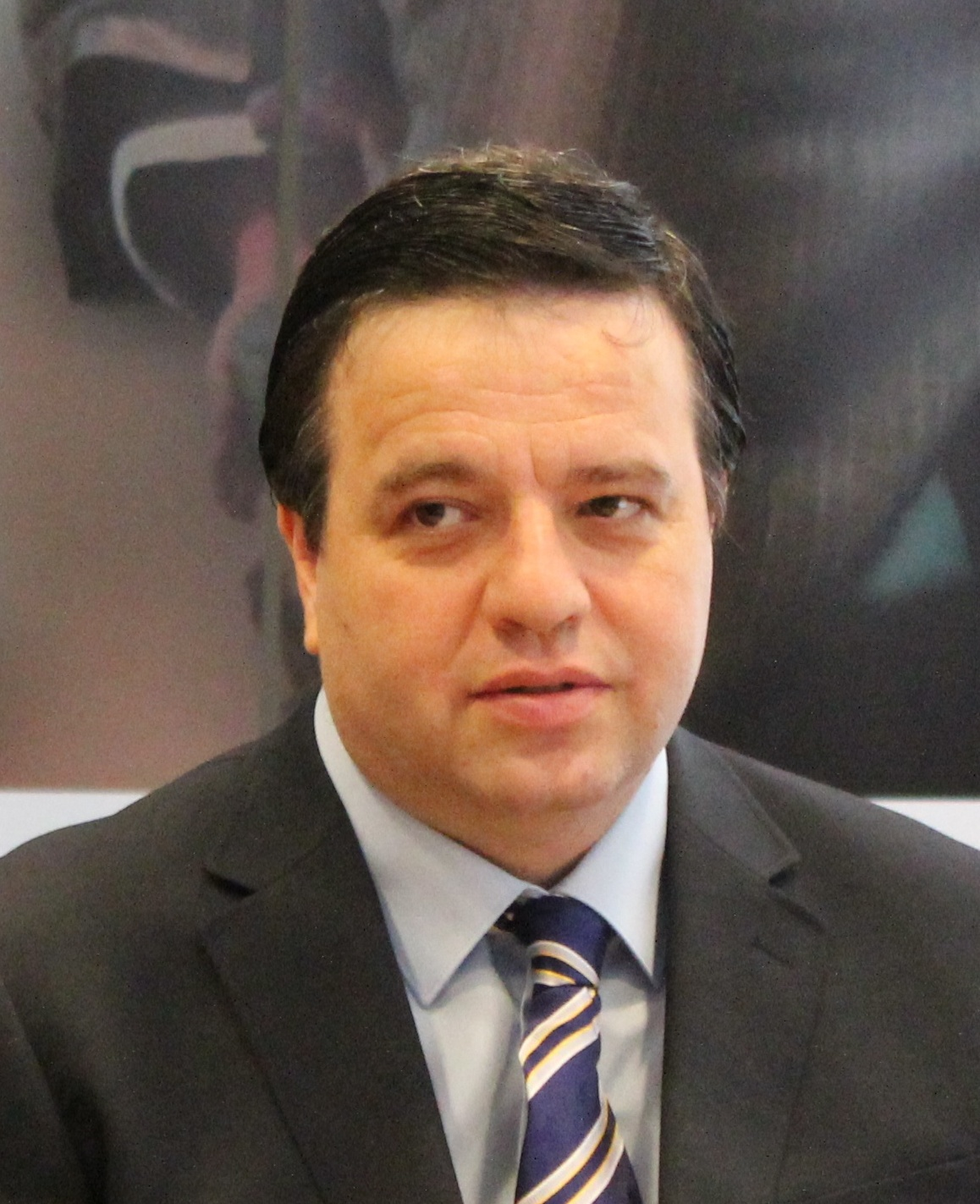
- 2017 World Draughts Champion Alexander Schwarzman

Tournament information
- Location: Tallinn, Estonia
- Dates: 1 October–16 October
- Administrator: FMJD
- Tournament format: Round-robin tournament
- Venue(s): Hotel Euroopa, Paul Keres Chess House

Final positions
- Champion: Alexander Schwarzman
- Runner-up: Alexei Chizhov

The 2017 World Draughts Championship in international draughts was held from 1 to 16 October, 2017 in Tallinn, Estonia. 79 players, who qualified through the championships of Europe, Asia, Africa, and North and South America, competed in the tournament. Among them was women's grandmaster Matrena Nogovitsyna from Russia. The total prize money for the tournament was 20,000 euros. The tournament was supervised by main referee Andriy Shcherbatyuk (Ukraine).

Four rounds were played in the Hotel Euroopa, while the rest were played in the Paul Keres Chess House. The 2017 Women's World Draughts Championship took place simultaneously at the same locations.

== Rules and regulations ==
In the first stage, 79 participants were divided into 3 groups, each playing a 9-round Swiss-system tournament. Ties on points were resolved using the truncated Solkoff coefficient. The top 4 players from each group, 12 players in total, advanced to the final.

The final was played as a round-robin tournament. The games were played with the official FMJD classical time control: 80 minutes plus a 1-minute increment per move.

The final rankings were determined by total points. If two or more players finished with the same score, the following tiebreaks were applied:

1. Number of wins.
2. Results in the direct encounters between the tied players.
3. Results obtained against opponents in order of their final ranking.

== Schedule ==
Date	Time	Event	Venue
1 October	11:00	Opening	Hotel Euroopa
1 October	15:00	Round 1	Hotel Euroopa
2 October	9:00	Round 2	Hotel Euroopa
2 October	16:00	Round 3	Hotel Euroopa
3 October	16:00	Round 4	Hotel Euroopa
4 October	9:00	Round 5	Paul Keres Chess House
4 October	16:00	Round 6	Paul Keres Chess House
5 October	16:00	Round 7	Paul Keres Chess House
6 October	9:00	Round 8	Paul Keres Chess House
6 October	16:00	Round 9	Paul Keres Chess House
7 October		Rest day	
8 October	9:00	Final Round 1	Paul Keres Chess House
8 October	16:00	Final Round 2	Paul Keres Chess House
9 October	16:00	Final Round 3	Paul Keres Chess House
10 October	16:00	Final Round 4	Paul Keres Chess House
11 October	9:00	Final Round 5	Paul Keres Chess House
11 October	16:00	Final Round 6	Paul Keres Chess House
12 October	16:00	Final Round 7	Paul Keres Chess House
13 October	9:00	Final Round 8	Paul Keres Chess House
13 October	16:00	Final Round 9	Paul Keres Chess House
14 October	9:00	Final Round 10	Paul Keres Chess House
15 October	9:00	Final Round 11	Paul Keres Chess House
15 October	17:00	Closing	Paul Keres Chess House

== Results ==
=== Semifinal ===
GMI — international grandmaster

MI — international master

MF — master FMJD

GMIF — women's international grandmaster

Advanced to the final

==== Group A ====
Place	Name	Country	Title	Rating	Points	Coeff.
1	Alexander Baljakin	Netherlands	GMI	2394	12	
2	Alexander Schwarzman	Russia	GMI	2432	11	87
3	Yuri Anikeev	Ukraine	GMI	2379	11	87
4	Vadim Virny	Germany	GMI	2354	11	87
5	Aleksej Domchev	Lithuania	GMI	2334	11	86
6	N'Diaga Samb	Senegal	GMI	2322	11	86
7	Ainur Shaibakov	Russia	GMI	2349	11	81
8	Souleymane Keita	Canada	MI	2282	11	81
9	Nikolai Gulyaev	Russia	MI	2299	10	
10	Ron Heusdens	Netherlands	GMI	2331	10	
11	Frank Teer	Netherlands	MI	2298	10	
12	Manlai Ravjir	Mongolia	GMI	2174	10	
13	Alexander Verkhovykh	Russia	MI	2227	10	
14	Arnaud Cordier	France	GMI	2358	10	
15	Guno Burleson	Suriname	MI	2254	10	
16	Derby Martes	Dominican Republic		2259	10	
17	Martijn van Gortel	Netherlands	MF	2117	10	
18	Jitse Slump	Netherlands	MI	2273	9	
19	Raimonds Vipulis	Latvia	GMI	2310	9	
20	Arjan van den Berg	Israel		2178	9	
21	Raivo Rist	Estonia	MF	2149	8	
22	Vaclav Krista	Czech Republic	MI	2092	8	
23	Piotr Paluch	Poland	MF	2119	8	
24	Bryan Wollaert	Belgium	MF	2127	8	
25	Uno Plakk	Estonia	MF	2024	6	
26	Priit Lokotar	Estonia		1902	6	
27	Behcet Celebi	Cyprus		1900	2	
28	Epherem Demessie	Ethiopia		1901	0	

==== Group B ====
Place	Name	Country	Title	Rating	Points	Coeff.
1	Alexander Georgiev	Russia	GMI	2428	12	
2	Guntis Valneris	Latvia	GMI	2374	12	
3	Artem Ivanov	Ukraine	GMI	2367	11	85
4	Martijn van IJzendoorn	Netherlands	GMI	2395	11	83
5	Dul Erdenebileg	Mongolia	GMI	2266	11	80
6	Leopold Kouogueu Kouomou	Cameroon	GMI	2304	11	78
7	Jan Groenendijk	Netherlands	GMI	2350	10	
8	Hein Meijer	Netherlands	GMI	2317	10	
9	Murodullo Amrillaev	Russia	GMI	2351	10	
10	Ivan Trofimov	Russia	GMI	2332	10	
11	Adonis Joachim Ano	Ivory Coast	MI	2306	10	
12	Alessio Scaggiante	Italy	MF	2119	10	
13	Jean Marc Ndjofang	Cameroon	GMI	2333	9	
14	Chengcheng Tian	China	MF	2132	9	
15	Matrena Nogovitsyna	Russia	MI	2228	9	
16	Youssou NDiaye	Senegal	MF	2183	9	
17	Oscar Lognon	France	MI	2279	9	
18	Kees Romijn	Netherlands	MF	2136	9	
19	Mehmet Yöney	Turkey	MF	2119	8	
20	Vasyl Pikiniar	Ukraine	MF	2165	8	
21	Janiston Ramirez	Dominican Republic		2251	8	
22	Sergei Nosevitch	Belarus	GMI	2262	7	
23	Roep Bhawanibhiek	Netherlands	MF	2095	7	
24	Andreas Tulva	Estonia		2021	6	
25	Argo Unnuk	Estonia	MF	2204	6	
26	Gerrit Alink	Indonesia		1909	2	

==== Group C ====
Place	Name	Country	Title	Rating	Points	Coeff.
1	Wouter Wolff	Netherlands	MI	2278	12	
2	Alexei Chizhov	Russia	GMI	2409	11	87
3	Joel Atse	Ivory Coast	GMI	2337	11	86
4	Evgeni Vatutin	Belarus	GMI	2329	11	84
5	Roel Boomstra	Netherlands	GMI	2400	11	82
5	Alexander Getmanski	Russia	GMI	2367	11	82
7	Kees Thijssen	Netherlands	GMI	2326	11	80
8	Macodou NDiaye	Senegal	GMI	2336	11	79
9	Maksim Milshin	Russia	MF	2278	11	76
10	Wouter Sipma	Netherlands	GMI	2352	10	
11	Daniele Macali	Italy	MF	2143	10	
12	Edvardas Bužinskis	Lithuania	GMI	2314	9	
13	Christian Niami	Cameroon	MF	2294	9	
14	Miguel Almanzar	Dominican Republic	MF	2372	9	
15	Evgeni Gurkov	Russia	MF	2178	9	
16	Zhiyong Xiong	China	MF	2161	9	
17	Carlos Lorevil	Curaçao	MF	2120	9	
18	Piotr Chmiel	Poland	MI	2115	9	
19	Igor Kirzner	Ukraine	GMI	2259	8	
20	Villem Lüüs	Estonia	MF	2116	8	
21	Gerelbold Ganbold	Mongolia	MF	2124	8	
22	Frantz Forbin	France	MI	2230	8	
23	Alexander Rudnitsky	United States	MF	2194	8	
24	Raido Värik	Estonia		2247	6	
25	Dan Isabirye	Uganda		2000	3	
26	Evert Wiskerke	Romania		1984	2	

=== Final ===
Place	Name	Country	Title	Rating	1	2	3	4	5	6	7	8	9	10	11	12	Points	Wins	Draws	Losses
1	Alexander Schwarzman	Russia	GMI	2432	*	1	1	1	1	1	1	2	2	1	1	2	14	3	8	0
2	Alexei Chizhov	Russia	GMI	2409	1	*	1	1	1	1	2	1	1	1	2	1	13	2	9	0
3	Guntis Valneris	Latvia	GMI	2374	1	1	*	1	1	1	1	2	1	2	1	1	13	2	9	0
4	Alexander Baljakin	Netherlands	GMI	2394	1	1	1	*	1	2	1	1	1	1	1	1	12	1	10	0
5	Yuri Anikeev	Ukraine	GMI	2379	1	1	1	1	*	1	1	1	1	2	1	1	12	1	10	0
6	Joel Atse	Ivory Coast	GMI	2337	1	1	1	0	1	*	1	1	2	1	1	1	11	1	9	1
7	Alexander Georgiev	Russia	GMI	2428	1	0	1	1	1	1	*	2	1	1	1	1	11	1	9	1
8	Wouter Wolf	Netherlands	MI	2278	0	1	0	1	1	1	0	*	2	1	1	2	10	2	6	3
9	Martijn van IJzendoorn	Netherlands	GMI	2395	0	1	1	1	1	0	1	0	*	1	2	1	9	1	7	3
10	Evgeni Vatutin	Belarus	GMI	2329	1	1	0	1	0	1	1	1	1	*	1	1	9	0	9	2
11	Vadim Virny	Germany	GMI	2354	1	0	1	1	1	1	1	1	0	1	*	1	9	0	9	2
12	Artem Ivanov	Ukraine	GMI	2367	0	1	1	1	1	1	1	0	1	1	1	*	9	0	9	2

== See also ==
- List of Draughts World Championship winners
