= 2019 World Draughts Championship =

Draughts tournament

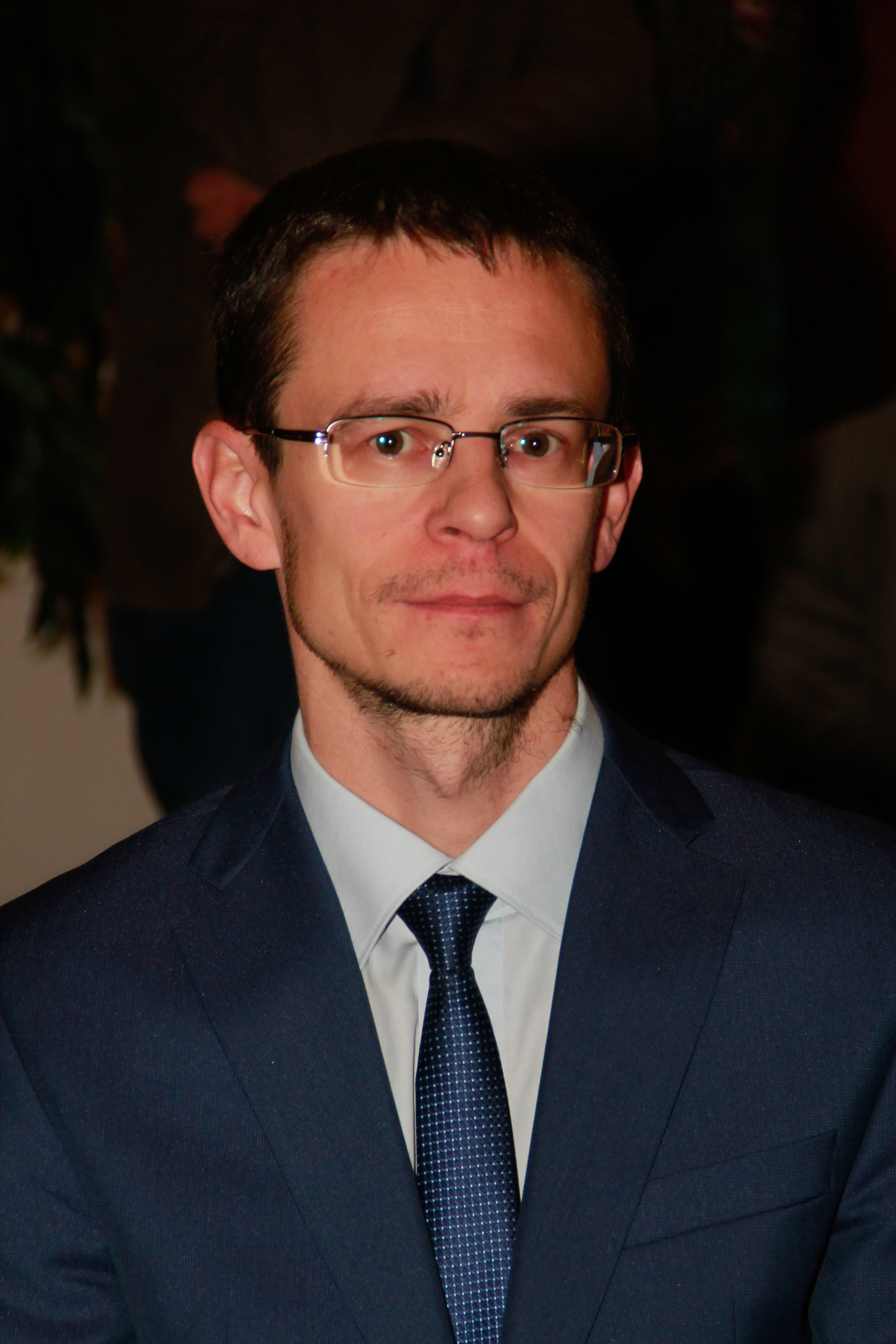
- 2019 World Draughts Champion Alexander Georgiev

Tournament information
- Location: Yamoussoukro, Ivory Coast
- Dates: 15 September–3 October
- Administrator: FMJD
- Tournament format: Round-robin tournament
- Venue: Hotel HP Resort

Final positions
- Champion: Alexander Georgiev
- Runner-up: Pan Yiming

The 2019 World Draughts Championship in international draughts was held from 15 September to 3 October, 2019, at the Hotel HP Resort in Yamoussoukro, Ivory Coast. The championship was played under the auspices of the International Draughts Federation (FMJD) as a round-robin tournament with twenty players. The total prize money for the tournament was 20,000 euros.

The 2016 and 2018 World Champion, Roel Boomstra, did not play in the championship.

Alexander Georgiev won the title to become World Draughts Champion for the tenth time, equaling Alexei Chizhov.

== Rules and regulations ==
The games were played with the official FMJD classical time control: 80 minutes plus a 1-minute increment per move. FMJD regulations prohibited players from agreeing to a draw before each had completed 40 moves; doing so required the referee to award both players 0 points.

The final rankings were determined by total points. If two or more players finished with the same score, the following tiebreaks were applied:

1. Number of wins.
2. Results in the direct encounters between the tied players.
3. Results obtained against opponents in order of their final ranking.

== Schedule ==
Round	Date	Time
1	15 September	13:30
2	16 September	13:30
3	17 September	13:30
4	18 September	13:30
5	19 September	9:30
6	19 September	15:30
Rest day	20 September	
7	21 September	13:30
8	22 September	13:30
9	23 September	13:30
10	24 September	13:30
11	25 September	9:30
12	25 September	15:30
Rest day	26 September	
13	27 September	13:30
14	28 September	13:30
15	29 September	13:30
16	30 September	13:30
17	1 October	13:30
18	2 October	13:30
19	3 October	9:30

== Participants ==
Number	Title	Name	Country	Qualification Path
1	GMI	Alexander Schwarzman	Russia	World Champion 2017
2	GMI	Alexei Chizhov	Russia	2nd place in World Championship 2017
3	GMI	Joel N'cho Atse	Ivory Coast	Africa 1
4	GMI	N'Diaga Samb	Senegal	Africa 2
5	MF	Landry Nga	Cameroon	Africa 3
6	CMF	Kassim Souare	Mali	Africa 4
7	GMI	Guno Burleson	Suriname	America 1
8	GMI	Allan Igor Moreno Silva	Brazil	America 2
9	GMI	Pan Yiming	China	Asia 1
10	MI	Otgonbileg Tserenbayamba	Mongolia	Asia 2
11	GMI	Michael Semyaniuk	Belarus	Europe 1
12	GMI	Alexander Georgiev	Russia	Europe 2
13	GMI	Martijn van IJzendoorn	Netherlands	Europe 3
14	MI	Jitse Slump	Netherlands	Europe 4
15	MI	Nicolay Germogenov	Russia	Europe 5
16	GMI	Guntis Valneris	Latvia	Best rating
17	GMI	Ivan Trofimov	Russia	Best from World Cup
18	GMI	Jan Groenendijk	Netherlands	First from Reserve
19	MF	Kpangni Jacques Aka	Ivory Coast	Organiser place
20	CMF	Ahmed Sanogo	Ivory Coast	Sponsor place

GMI — international grandmaster

MI — international master

MF — master FMJD

CMF — candidate for master FMJD

== Final standings ==
Place	Name	Country	Title	Rating	1	2	3	4	5	6	7	8	9	10	11	12	13	14	15	16	17	18	19	20	Points	Wins	Draws	Losses
1	Alexander Georgiev	Russia	GMI	2418	*	1	1	1	1	1	2	2	1	2	1	2	2	1	2	1	1	2	2	2	28	9	10	0
2	Pan Yiming	China	GMI	2206	1	*	1	1	1	1	1	1	1	2	2	2	2	1	1	1	2	2	2	2	27	8	11	0
3	Guntis Valneris	Latvia	GMI	2399	1	1	*	1	1	1	1	1	1	1	2	1	1	2	2	2	2	2	2	2	27	8	11	0
4	Jan Groenendijk	Netherlands	GMI	2376	1	1	1	*	1	1	1	2	1	1	2	1	1	1	1	1	2	2	2	2	25	6	13	0
5	Alexander Schwarzman	Russia	GMI	2328	1	1	1	1	*	1	1	1	1	0	1	1	2	2	1	1	2	1	2	2	23	5	13	1
6	Martijn van IJzendoorn	Netherlands	GMI	2378	1	1	1	1	1	*	0	1	1	2	2	1	1	2	1	1	1	2	2	1	23	5	13	1
7	Alexei Chizhov	Russia	GMI	2389	0	1	1	1	1	2	*	1	1	1	1	2	1	1	1	2	2	1	1	1	22	4	14	1
8	Joel N'cho Atse	Ivory Coast	GMI	2370	0	1	1	0	1	1	1	*	1	2	1	1	0	2	1	1	1	2	2	2	21	5	11	3
9	Jitse Slump	Netherlands	MI	2293	1	1	1	1	1	1	1	1	*	2	1	1	2	1	1	2	2	1	0	0	21	4	13	2
10	Kassim Souare	Mali	CMF	2230	0	0	1	1	2	0	1	0	0	*	1	1	1	2	2	1	2	2	1	1	19	5	9	5
11	Allan Igor Moreno Silva	Brazil	GMI	2322	1	0	0	0	1	0	1	1	1	1	*	0	2	1	1	2	2	1	1	2	18	4	10	5
12	Landry Nga	Cameroon	MF	2296	0	0	1	1	1	1	0	1	1	1	2	*	1	1	1	2	0	1	1	2	18	3	12	4
13	Ivan Trofimov	Russia	GMI	2316	0	0	1	1	0	1	1	2	0	1	0	1	*	0	1	2	2	1	1	2	17	4	9	6
14	Nicolay Germogenov	Russia	MI	2312	1	1	0	1	0	0	1	0	1	0	1	1	2	*	1	1	1	1	2	1	16	2	12	5
15	Michael Semyaniuk	Belarus	GMI	2274	0	1	0	1	1	1	1	1	1	0	1	1	1	1	*	1	1	0	1	2	16	1	14	4
16	N'Diaga Samb	Senegal	GMI	2323	1	1	0	1	1	1	0	1	0	1	0	0	0	1	1	*	0	2	1	2	14	2	10	7
17	Otgonbileg Tserenbayamba	Mongolia	MI	2174	1	0	0	0	0	1	0	1	0	0	0	2	0	1	1	2	*	1	2	0	12	3	6	10
18	Guno Burleson	Suriname	GMI	2272	0	0	0	0	1	0	1	0	1	0	1	1	1	1	2	0	1	*	1	1	12	1	10	8
19	Kpangni Jacques Aka	Ivory Coast	MF	2247	0	0	0	0	0	0	1	0	2	1	1	1	1	0	1	1	0	1	*	1	11	1	9	9
20	Ahmed Sanogo	Ivory Coast	CMF	2196	0	0	0	0	0	1	1	0	2	1	0	0	0	1	0	0	2	1	1	*	10	2	6	11
