= 2021 World Draughts Championship =

Draughts tournament

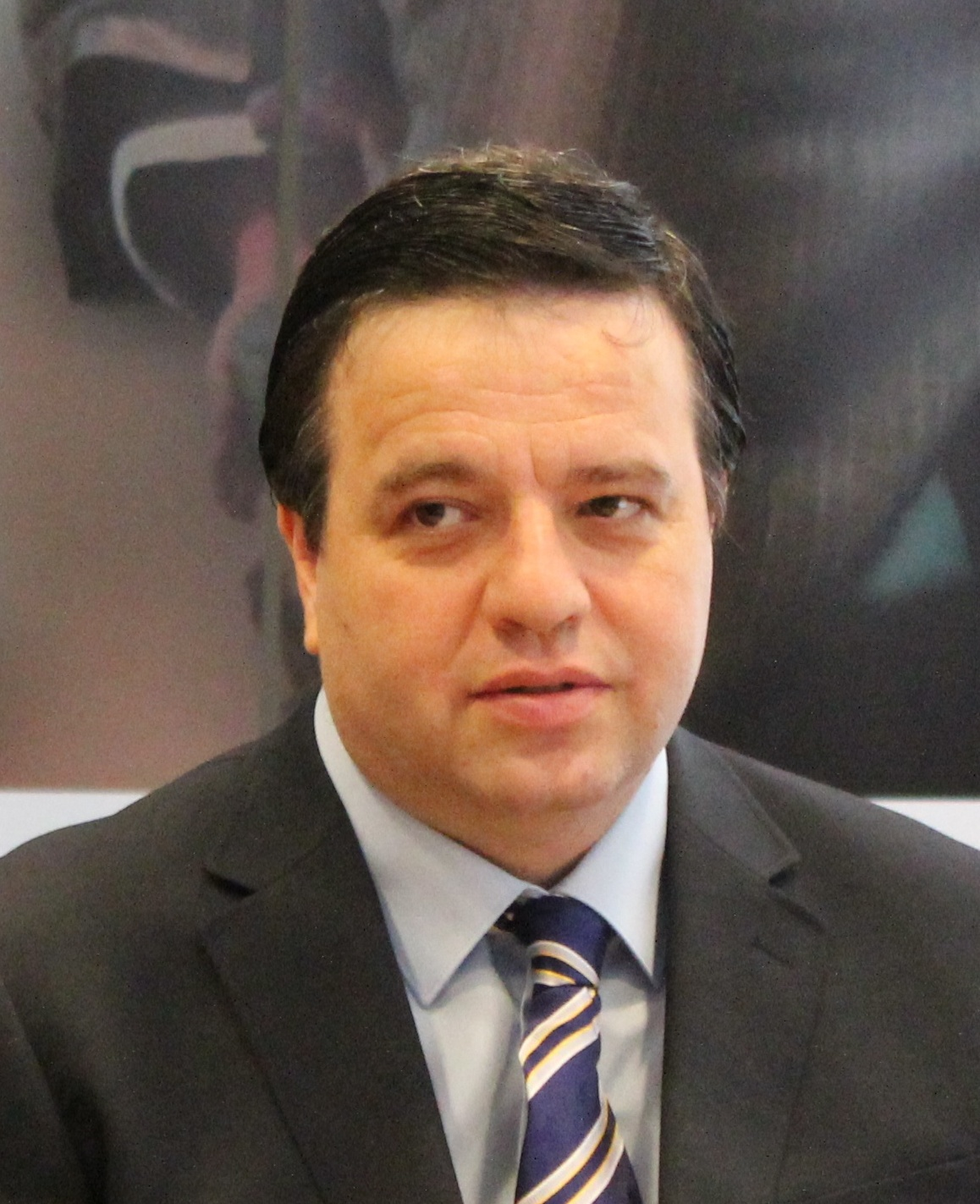
- 2021 World Draughts Champion Alexander Schwarzman

Tournament information
- Location: Tallinn, Estonia
- Dates: 28 June–14 July
- Administrator: FMJD
- Tournament format: Round-robin tournament
- Venue: Hotel Viru

Final positions
- Champion: Alexander Schwarzman
- Runner-up: Alexander Getmanski

The 2021 World Draughts Championship in international draughts was held from 28 June to 14 July, 2021 at the Hotel Viru in Tallinn, Estonia. It was held under the auspices of the International Draughts Federation (FMJD). Forty players competed in the tournament, which was played in a COVID bubble. In the first stage, all players were divided into four groups. The best three players from each group advanced to the final. All stages were played as a round-robin tournament. The main referee was IR Frank Teer (Netherlands). The total prize money for the tournament was 20,000 euros.

The 2021 Women's World Draughts Championship took place simultaneously at the same hotel.

Alexander Schwarzman from Russia won his fifth title.

== Rules and regulations ==
The games were played with the official FMJD classical time control: 80 minutes plus a 1-minute increment per move. FMJD regulations prohibited players from agreeing to a draw before each had completed 40 moves; doing so required the referee to award both players 0 points.

The final rankings were determined by total points. If two or more players finished with the same score, the following tiebreaks were applied:

1. Number of wins.
2. Results in the direct encounters between the tied players.
3. Results obtained against opponents in order of their final ranking.

For places 1–3, tiebreaks using the Lehmann–Georgiev system (15 minutes plus a 2-second increment per move for an unlimited number of games) were played if necessary; other places were shared.

== Schedule ==
Round	Date	Time
1	28 June	15:00
2	29 June	9:00
3	29 June	15:00
4	30 June	15:00
5	1 July	9:00
6	1 July	15:00
7	2 July	9:00
8	2 July	15:00
9	3 July	15:00
Final 1	5 July	13:30
Final 2	6 July	13:30
Final 3	7 July	13:30
Final 4	8 July	13:30
Final 5	9 July	13:30
Final 6	11 July	13:30
Final 7	12 July	13:30
Final 8	13 July	13:30
Final 9	14 July	9:30

== Participants ==
The published list was preliminary. Alexander Georgiev, Landry Nga, Alain Bukasa, Baatarsukh Munkhjin, and Bedia Guy Serges Olivier did not take part in the tournament.

Number	Name	Country	Title	Qualification Path
1	Alexander Georgiev	Russia	GMI	WC 2019
2	Roel Boomstra	Netherlands	GMI	WC 2018/2019
3	Guntis Valneris	Latvia	GMI	WC 2019 3rd place
4	Jan Groenendijk	Netherlands	GMI	WC 2019 4th place
5	Priit Lokotar	Estonia		Organization place
6	Kris Taimre	Estonia		Sponsor place
7	N'Diaga Samb	Senegal	GMI	Africa
8	Landry Nga	Cameroon	GMI	Africa
9	Joel N'cho Atse	Ivory Coast	GMI	Africa
10	Alain Dingombe Bukasa	Democratic Republic of the Congo	GMI	Africa
11	Jean Marc Ndjofang	Cameroon	GMI	Africa
12	Kassim Souare	Mali	MI	Africa
13	Saint-Juste Makendy	Haiti		America
14	Souleymane Keita	United States	MI	America
15	Derby Martes	Dominican Republic		America
16	Yevgeniy Sklyarov	United States	MI	America
17	Baatarsukh Munkhjin	Mongolia	GMI	Asia
18	Tsogtbaatar Sukhbat	Mongolia	MF	Asia
19	Martijn van IJzendoorn	Netherlands	GMI	Europe
20	Alexander Schwarzman	Russia	GMI	Europe
21	Artem Ivanov	Ukraine	GMI	Europe
22	Alexander Getmanski	Russia	GMI	Europe
23	Jitse Slump	Netherlands	MI	Europe
24	Yuri Anikeev	Ukraine	GMI	Europe
25	Kevin Machtelinck	France	MI	Europe
26	Aleksej Domchev	Lithuania	GMI	Europe
27	Raimonds Vipulis	Latvia	GMI	Europe
28	Oscar Lognon	France	MI	Europe
29	Valery Kudriavcev	Lithuania	MF	Europe
30	Aleksei Kunitsa	Belarus	MI	Europe
31	Igor Chartoriyski	Germany	MF	Europe
32	Filip Kuczewski	Poland	MF	Europe
33	Ainur Shaibakov	Russia	GMI	World Cup 2020
34	Ivan Trofimov	Russia	GMI	World Cup 2020
35	Aman Ehiere Eugene	Ivory Coast	MI	World Cup 2020
36	Aka Kpangni Jacques	Ivory Coast	MF	World Cup 2020
37	Bedia Guy Serges Olivier	Ivory Coast		Global reserve list
38	Mariko Mamoutou	Mali	MI	Global reserve list
39	Mbongo Thomy lucien	Cameroon	MI	Global reserve list
40	Andrej Kalmakov	Russia	GMI	Global reserve list

GMI — international grandmaster

MI — international master

MF — master FMJD

== Results ==
=== Semifinal ===
Advanced to the final

==== Group A ====
Place	Name	Country	Title	Rating	1	2	3	4	5	6	7	8	9	10	Points	Wins	Draws	Losses
1.	Roel Boomstra	Netherlands	GMI	2408	*	1	1	1	1	2	2	2	2	2	14	5	4	0
2.	Raimonds Vipulis	Latvia	GMI	2275	1	*	1	1	1	2	1	1	2	2	12	3	6	0
3.	Alexander Getmanski	Russia	GMI	2355	1	1	*	1	1	1	2	2	1	2	12	3	6	0
4.	Aleksei Kunitsa	Belarus	MI	2220	1	1	1	*	1	1	1	2	2	2	12	3	6	0
5.	Ainur Shaibakov	Russia	GMI	2348	1	1	1	1	*	1	1	1	1	2	10	1	8	0
6.	Kevin Machtelinck	France	MI	2321	0	0	1	1	1	*	1	1	1	2	8	1	6	2
7.	Valery Kudriavcev	Lithuania	MF	2226	0	1	0	1	1	1	*	1	1	1	7	0	7	2
8.	Aleksej Domchev	Lithuania	GMI	2319	0	1	0	0	1	1	1	*	1	1	6	0	6	3
9.	Edmond Antoine Beugre	Ivory Coast	MF	2283	0	0	1	0	1	1	1	1	*	-	5	0	5	4
10.	Kris Taimre	Estonia		1899	0	0	0	0	0	0	1	1	+2	*	4	1	2	6

==== Group B ====
Place	Name	Country	Title	Rating	1	2	3	4	5	6	7	8	9	10	Points	Wins	Draws	Losses
1.	N'cho Joel Atse	Ivory Coast	GMI	2366	*	1	1	1	1	2	2	1	-	2	11	3	5	1
2.	Nicolay Germogenov	Russia	MI	2300	1	*	1	2	1	1	1	1	1	2	11	2	7	0
3.	Jitse Slump	Netherlands	MI	2346	1	1	*	1	1	1	2	1	1	2	11	2	7	0
4.	Mariko Mamoutou	Mali	MI	2188	1	0	1	*	1	2	2	1	1	1	10	2	6	1
5.	Guntis Valneris	Latvia	GMI	2406	1	1	1	1	*	1	1	2	1	1	10	1	8	0
6.	Kees Thijssen	Netherlands	GMI	2329	0	1	1	0	1	*	1	1	2	2	9	2	5	2
7.	Ivan Trofimov	Russia	GMI	2282	0	1	0	0	1	1	*	1	2	2	8	2	4	3
8.	Oscar Lognon	France	MI	2241	1	1	1	1	0	1	1	*	1	1	8	0	8	1
9.	Igor Kirzner	Ukraine	GMI	2268	+2	1	1	1	1	0	0	1	*	0	7	1	5	3
10.	Filip Kuczewski	Poland	MF	2199	0	0	0	1	1	0	0	1	2	*	5	1	3	5

==== Group C ====
Place	Name	Country	Title	Rating	1	2	3	4	5	6	7	8	9	10	Points	Wins	Draws	Losses
1.	Jan Groenendijk	Netherlands	GMI	2392	*	1	1	2	1	2	1	2	2	2	14	5	4	0
2.	Wouter Sipma	Netherlands	GMI	2333	1	*	1	1	1	1	2	2	1	2	12	3	6	0
3.	Artem Ivanov	Ukraine	GMI	2369	1	1	*	1	1	2	1	1	1	2	11	2	7	0
4.	Kassim Souare	Mali	MI	2252	0	1	1	*	1	1	2	1	1	2	10	2	6	1
5.	Andrej Kalmakov	Russia	GMI	2347	1	1	1	1	*	1	1	1	1	2	10	1	8	0
6.	Aman Ehiere Eugene	Ivory Coast	MI	2287	0	1	0	1	1	*	1	-	2	2	8	2	4	3
7.	Thomy Lucien Mbongo	Cameroon	MI	2270	1	0	1	0	1	1	*	1	2	1	8	1	6	2
8.	Yevgeniy Sklyarov	United States	MI	2297	0	0	1	1	1	+2	1	*	1	1	8	1	6	2
9.	Igor Chartoriyski	Germany	MF	2199	0	1	1	1	1	0	0	1	*	1	6	0	6	3
10.	Priit Lokotar	Estonia		1947	0	0	0	0	0	0	1	1	1	*	3	0	3	6

==== Group D ====
Place	Name	Country	Title	Rating	1	2	3	4	5	6	7	8	9	10	Points	Wins	Draws	Losses
1.	Martijn van IJzendoorn	Netherlands	GMI	2391	*	1	1	1	1	2	2	2	2	2	14	5	4	0
2.	Alexander Schwarzman	Russia	GMI	2379	1	*	1	1	1	2	1	2	2	1	12	3	6	0
3.	Christian Niami	Cameroon	MI	2265	1	1	*	0	1	1	2	1	2	2	11	3	5	1
4.	Tsogtbaatar Sukhbat	Mongolia	MF	2189	1	1	2	*	1	2	1	1	1	1	11	2	7	0
5.	Yuri Anikeev	Ukraine	GMI	2336	1	1	1	1	*	1	1	1	1	1	9	0	9	0
6.	Saint-Juste Makendy	Haiti	CMF	2338	0	0	1	0	1	*	1	1	2	2	8	2	4	3
7.	N'Diaga Samb	Senegal	GMI	2296	0	1	0	1	1	1	*	2	1	1	8	1	6	2
8.	Souleymane Keita	United States	MI	2291	0	0	1	1	1	1	0	*	2	1	7	1	5	3
9.	Derby Martes	Dominican Republic	CMF	2272	0	0	0	1	1	0	1	0	*	2	5	1	3	5
10.	Aka Kpangni Jacques	Ivory Coast	MF	2216	0	1	0	1	1	0	1	1	0	*	5	0	5	4

=== Final ===
Place	Name	Country	Title	Rating	1	2	3	4	5	6	7	8	9	10	11	12	Points	Wins	Draws	Losses
1.	Alexander Schwarzman	Russia	GMI	2380	*	1	1	1	1	1	1	1	2	1	2	2	14	3	8	0
2.	Alexander Getmanski	Russia	GMI	2360	1	*	1	2	1	1	1	2	1	1	1	1	13	2	9	0
3.	Roel Boomstra	Netherlands	GMI	2410	1	1	*	1	1	1	1	2	1	2	1	1	13	2	9	0
4.	Jan Groenendijk	Netherlands	GMI	2407	1	0	1	*	1	1	1	2	1	1	2	1	12	2	8	1
5.	Martijn van IJzendoorn	Netherlands	GMI	2386	1	1	1	1	*	1	1	1	1	1	1	2	12	1	10	0
6.	Wouter Sipma	Netherlands	GMI	2349	1	1	1	1	1	*	1	0	1	1	1	2	11	1	9	1
7.	Artem Ivanov	Ukraine	GMI	2369	1	1	1	1	1	1	*	1	1	1	1	1	11	0	11	0
8.	Christian Niami	Cameroon	MI	2265	1	0	0	0	1	2	1	*	1	2	1	1	10	2	6	3
9.	Jitse Slump	Netherlands	MI	2355	0	1	1	1	1	1	1	1	*	1	1	1	10	0	10	1
10.	Nicolay Germogenov	Russia	MI	2297	1	1	0	1	1	1	1	0	1	*	1	1	9	0	9	2
11.	Raimonds Vipulis	Latvia	GMI	2275	0	1	1	0	1	1	1	1	1	1	*	1	9	0	9	2
12.	Joel N'cho Atse	Ivory Coast	GMI	2366	0	1	1	1	0	0	1	1	1	1	1	*	8	0	8	3
