= 2023 World Draughts Championship =

Draughts tournament

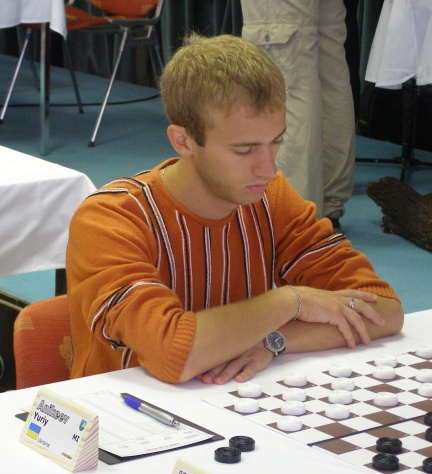
- 2023 World Draughts Champion Yuri Anikeev

Tournament information
- Location: Willemstad, Curaçao
- Dates: 28 September–13 October
- Administrator: FMJD
- Tournament format: Round-robin tournament
- Venue: Merakii Seaview Escape Resort

Final positions
- Champion: Yuri Anikeev
- Runner-up: Jan Groenendijk

The 2023 World Draughts Championship in international draughts was held from 28 September to 13 October, 2023 at the Merakii Seaview Escape Resort in Willemstad, Curaçao. The championship was played under the auspices of the International Draughts Federation (FMJD) as a round-robin tournament with twenty players. The total prize money for the tournament was 20,000 euros.

The tournament was characterized by a large number of changes in the list of participants, as a result of the suspension of the Russian and Belarusian Draughts federations, the coronavirus and visa problems.

Yuri Anikeev became world champion for the first time, one point ahead of Jan Groenendijk.

The 2023 Women's World Draughts Championship took place simultaneously at the same location.

== Rules and regulations ==
The games were played with the official FMJD classical time control: 90 minutes for 45 moves, followed by 30 minutes for the rest of the game plus a 30-second increment per move. FMJD regulations prohibited players from agreeing to a draw before each had completed 40 moves; doing so required the referee to award both players 0 points.

The final rankings were determined by total points. If two or more players finished with the same score, the following tiebreaks were applied:

1. Number of wins.
2. Results in the direct encounters between the tied players.
3. Results obtained against opponents in order of their final ranking.

== Schedule ==
Round	Date	Time
1	28 September	15:30
2	29 September	10:00
3	29 September	16:00
4	30 September	10:00
5	1 October	10:00
6	2 October	10:00
7	2 October	16:00
8	4 October	10:00
9	5 October	10:00
10	5 October	16:00
11	6 October	10:00
12	7 October	10:00
13	8 October	10:00
14	9 October	10:00
15	9 October	16:00
16	11 October	10:00
17	12 October	10:00
18	12 October	16:00
19	13 October	10:00

== Participants ==
The published list was preliminary.

- Jean Marc Ndjofang, Adonis Ano, Mukendi Reagan Lutete, Makendy Saint Juste, Louis Talien, Sukhbat Tsogtbaatar, and Dul Erdenebileg did not take part in the tournament.
- They were replaced by Kees Thijssen, Martin Dolfing, Ron Heusdens, Hein Meijer, Yuri Bobkov, Carlos Lorevil, Angel Rafael Mejia, and Clifton Agatha.

N'Diaga Samb withdrew after the fourth round due to illness. His results were annulled.

Number	Name	Country	Qualification path
1	Jan Groenendijk	Netherlands	WC 2021 4th place
2	Martijn van IJzendoorn	Netherlands	WC 2021 5th place
3	Wouter Sipma	Netherlands	WC 2021 6th place
4	Joel N'cho Atse	Ivory Coast	Africa
5	Mukendi Reagan Lutet	Democratic Republic of the Congo	Africa
6	Adonis Ano	Ivory Coast	Africa
7	N'Diaga Samb	Senegal	Africa
8	Louis Talien	Haiti	America
9	Angel Rafael Mejia	Dominican Republic	America
10	Sukhbat Tsogtbaatar	Mongolia	Asia
11	Dul Erdenebileg	Mongolia	Asia
12	Jitse Slump	Netherlands	Europe
13	Guntis Valneris	Latvia	Europe
14	Arnaud Cordier	France	Europe
15	Yuri Anikeev	Ukraine	Europe
16	Sven Winkel	Netherlands	Europe
17	Jean Marc Ndjofang	Cameroon	World Cup
18	Artem Ivanov	Ukraine	World Cup
19	Martin Dolfing	Netherlands	Sponsor place
20	Mijail Eisden	Curaçao	Organization place

== Final standings ==
Place	Name	Country	Title	Rating	1	2	3	4	5	6	7	8	9	10	11	12	13	14	15	16	17	18	19	Points	Wins	Draws	Losses
1	Yuri Anikeev	Ukraine	GMI	2361	*	1	1	1	1	1	1	2	1	1	1	2	1	1	2	2	2	2	2	25	7	11	0
2	Jan Groenendijk	Netherlands	GMI	2412	1	*	1	1	1	1	1	1	1	1	2	1	2	1	1	2	2	2	2	24	6	12	0
3	Martijn van IJzendoorn	Netherlands	GMI	2386	1	1	*	1	1	1	1	1	1	1	1	2	1	1	2	1	2	2	2	23	5	13	0
4	Wouter Sipma	Netherlands	GMI	2375	1	1	1	*	1	1	1	1	1	1	1	1	1	1	2	2	2	2	2	23	5	13	0
5	Jitse Slump	Netherlands	GMI	2372	1	1	1	1	*	1	1	1	1	1	2	1	1	1	1	1	2	2	2	22	4	14	0
6	Artem Ivanov	Ukraine	GMI	2367	1	1	1	1	1	*	1	1	1	1	1	2	1	1	1	1	2	2	2	22	4	14	0
7	Joel N'cho Atse	Ivory Coast	GMI	2339	1	1	1	1	1	1	*	1	1	1	1	2	0	1	1	1	2	2	2	21	4	13	1
8	Martin Dolfing	Netherlands	GMI	2352	0	1	1	1	1	1	1	*	1	1	1	1	2	1	1	1	2	2	2	21	4	13	1
9	Kees Thijssen	Netherlands	GMI	2345	1	1	1	1	1	1	1	1	*	1	1	1	1	2	1	1	1	2	2	21	3	15	0
10	Guntis Valneris	Latvia	GMI	2383	1	1	1	1	1	1	1	1	1	*	1	1	1	1	2	1	2	1	2	21	3	15	0
11	Sven Winkel	Netherlands	GMI	2286	1	0	1	1	0	1	1	1	1	1	*	1	1	2	2	1	1	2	2	20	4	12	2
12	Ron Heusdens	Netherlands	GMI	2331	0	1	0	1	1	0	0	1	1	1	1	*	1	1	1	2	2	2	2	18	4	10	4
13	Arnaud Cordier	France	GMI	2355	1	0	1	1	1	1	2	0	1	1	1	1	*	2	1	1	0	1	2	18	3	12	3
14	Hein Meijer	Netherlands	GMI	2375	1	1	1	1	1	1	1	1	0	1	0	1	0	*	1	1	2	2	1	17	2	13	3
15	Yuri Bobkov	Ukraine	MF	2179	0	1	0	0	1	1	1	1	1	0	0	1	1	1	*	2	2	1	2	16	3	10	5
16	Angel Rafael Mejia	Dominican Republic	MF	2238	0	0	1	0	1	1	1	1	1	1	1	0	1	1	0	*	2	1	2	15	2	11	5
17	Carlos Lorevil	Curaçao	MF	2132	0	0	0	0	0	0	0	0	1	0	1	0	2	0	0	0	*	1	1	6	1	4	13
18	Mijail Eisden	Curaçao	MF	2096	0	0	0	0	0	0	0	0	0	1	0	0	1	0	1	1	1	*	0	5	0	5	13
19	Clifton Agatha	Curaçao	MF	2112	0	0	0	0	0	0	0	0	0	0	0	0	0	1	0	0	1	2	*	4	1	2	15
20	N'Diaga Samb	Senegal	GMI	2293																							
