= 2015 World Draughts Championship =

Draughts tournament

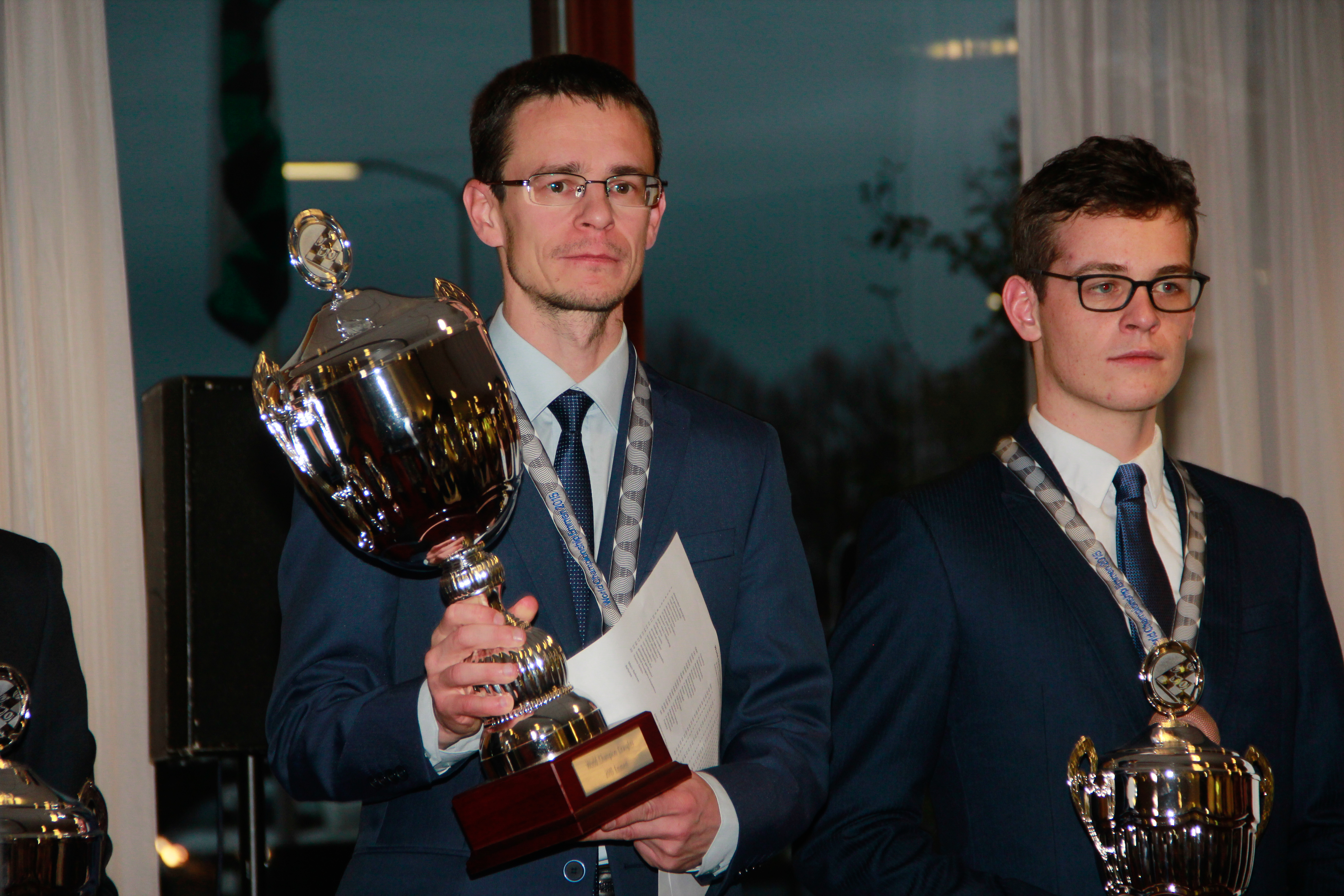
- Alexander Georgiev and Roel Boomstra

Tournament information
- Location: Emmen, Netherlands
- Dates: 8 November–24 November
- Administrator: FMJD
- Tournament format: Round-robin tournament
- Venue: Hotel ten Cate

Final positions
- Champion: Alexander Georgiev
- Runner-up: Jan Groenendijk

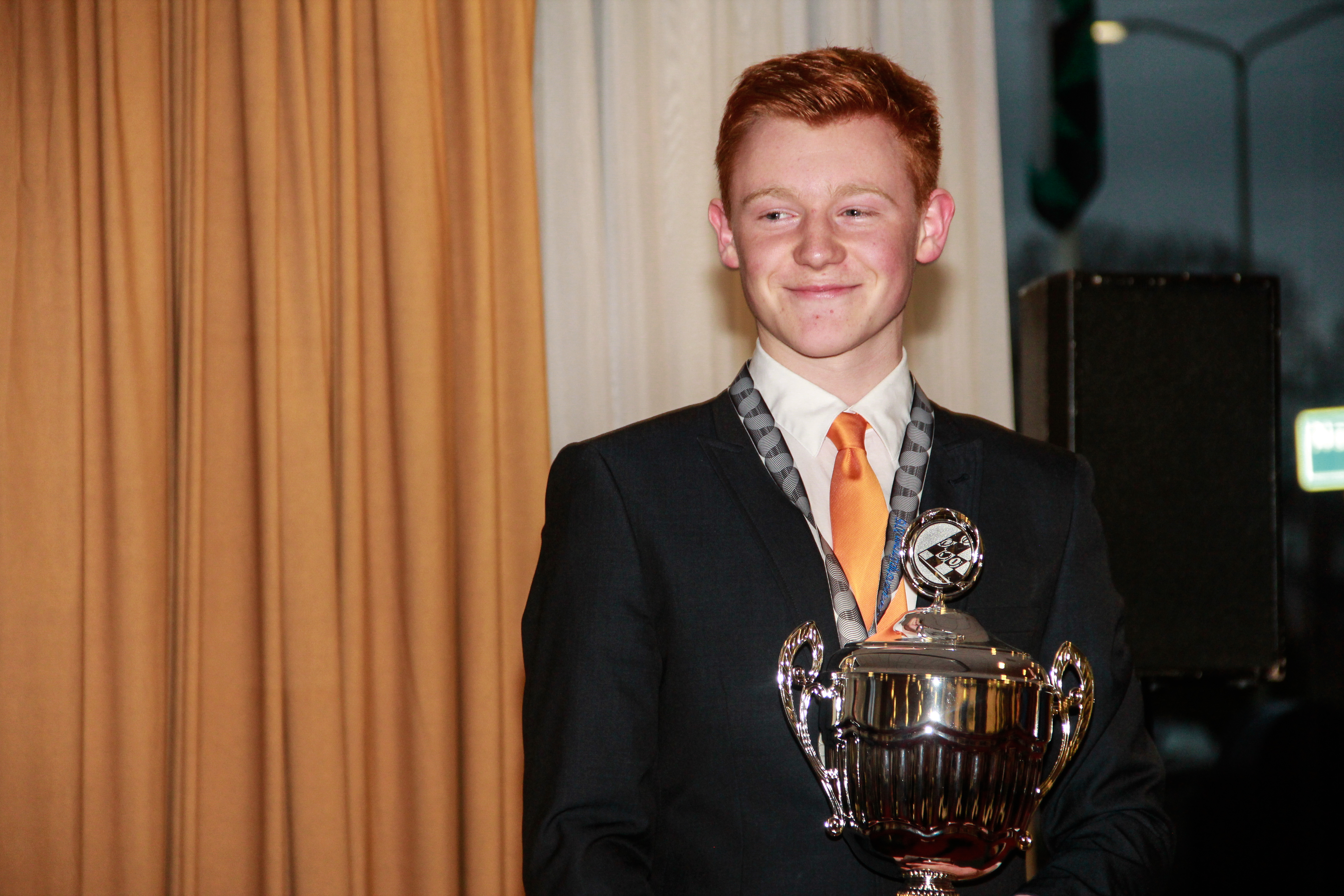
Jan Groenendijk

The 2015 World Draughts Championship in international draughts was held from 8–24 November, 2015 at the Hotel ten Cate in Emmen, Netherlands. The championship was played under the auspices of the International Draughts Federation (FMJD) as a round-robin tournament with 20 players (19 rounds). The total prize money for the tournament was 25,000 euros.

Alexander Georgiev became World Draughts Champion for the ninth time.

== Participants ==
Number	Title	Name	Country	Qualification path
1	GMI	Alexander Georgiev	Russia	World Champion
2	GMI	Jean Marc Ndjofang	Cameroon	2nd place in World Championship 2013
3	GMI	Roel Boomstra	Netherlands	3rd place in World Championship 2013
4	GMI	Alexander Baljakin	Netherlands	Organisation place
5	MI	Wouter Sipma	Netherlands	Sponsor place
6	GMI	Freddy Loko	Democratic Republic of the Congo	Africa #1
7	GMI	N'Diaga Samb	Senegal	Africa #2
8	GMI	Joel N'cho Atse	Ivory Coast	Africa #3
9	GMI	Leopold Kouogueu Kouomou	Cameroon	Africa #4
10	GMI	Dul Erdenebileg	Mongolia	Asian #1
11	GMI	Ganjargal Ganbaatar	Mongolia	Asian #2
12	GMI	Allan Igor Moreno Silva	Brazil	America #1
13	MI	Frants Forbin	France	America #2
14	GMI	Ainur Shaibakov	Russia	Europe #1
15	GMI	Arnaud Cordier	France	Europe #2
16	GMI	Alexei Chizhov	Russia	Europe #3
17	GMI	Ron Heusdens	Netherlands	Europe #4
18	MI	Jan Groenendijk	Netherlands	Europe #5
19	GMI	Raimonds Vipulis	Latvia	Europe #6
20	GMI	Artem Ivanov	Ukraine	Europe #7

== Rules and regulations ==
The games were played with the official FMJD classical time control: 80 minutes plus a 1-minute increment per move. FMJD regulations prohibited players from agreeing to a draw before each had completed 40 moves; doing so required the referee to award both players 0 points.

The final rankings were determined by total points. If two or more players finished with the same score, the following tiebreaks were applied:

1. Number of wins.
2. Results in the direct encounters between the tied players.
3. Results obtained against opponents in order of their final ranking.

== Results ==
Place	Name	Country	Title	Rating	1	2	3	4	5	6	7	8	9	10	11	12	13	14	15	16	17	18	19	20	Points	Wins	Draws	Losses
1	Alexander Georgiev	Russia	GMI	2419	*	1	1	1	1	1	1	1	1	1	2	2	1	1	2	2	1	1	2	2	25	6	13	0
2	Jan Groenendijk	Netherlands	MI	2343	1	*	0	1	1	1	1	1	2	1	1	1	2	1	2	2	1	1	2	2	24	6	12	1
3	Roel Boomstra	Netherlands	GMI	2411	1	2	*	1	1	1	1	1	1	1	1	2	1	1	1	2	1	1	2	2	24	5	14	0
4	Artem Ivanov	Ukraine	GMI	2371	1	1	1	*	1	1	1	1	1	1	2	1	2	2	1	1	2	1	1	1	23	4	15	0
5	Alexei Chizhov	Russia	GMI	2388	1	1	1	1	*	1	1	1	1	1	1	1	1	2	1	1	2	2	1	1	22	3	16	0
6	Alexander Baljakin	Netherlands	GMI	2390	1	1	1	1	1	*	1	1	1	1	1	1	1	1	2	1	2	2	1	1	22	3	16	0
7	Joel N'cho Atse	Ivory Coast	GMI	2329	1	1	1	1	1	1	*	1	1	1	0	1	1	1	2	2	1	1	1	2	21	3	15	1
8	Wouter Sipma	Netherlands	MI	2359	1	1	1	1	1	1	1	*	1	1	1	1	1	1	1	2	1	1	1	2	21	2	17	0
9	Jean Marc Ndjofang	Cameroon	GMI	2370	1	0	1	1	1	1	1	1	*	1	1	1	1	2	1	1	1	1	1	2	20	2	16	1
10	Allan Silva	Brazil	GMI	2288	1	1	1	1	1	1	1	1	1	*	1	1	1	1	1	1	1	1	1	2	20	1	18	0
11	N'Diaga Samb	Senegal	GMI	2302	0	1	1	0	1	1	2	1	1	1	*	1	2	0	1	1	1	1	1	2	19	3	13	3
12	Arnaud Cordier	France	GMI	2369	0	1	0	1	1	1	1	1	1	1	1	*	1	1	1	1	2	1	1	2	19	2	15	2
13	Freddy Loko	Democratic Republic of the Congo	GMI	2336	1	0	1	0	1	1	1	1	1	1	0	1	*	1	2	0	2	1	1	1	17	2	13	4
14	Ainur Shaibakov	Russia	GMI	2351	1	1	1	0	0	1	1	1	0	1	2	1	1	*	1	1	1	1	1	1	17	1	15	3
15	Raimonds Vipulis	Latvia	GMI	2284	0	0	1	1	1	0	0	1	1	1	1	1	0	1	*	1	1	2	1	2	16	2	12	5
16	Ron Heusdens	Netherlands	GMI	2334	0	0	0	1	1	1	0	0	1	1	1	1	2	1	1	*	1	1	1	2	16	2	12	5
17	Dul Erdenebileg	Mongolia	GMI	2269	1	1	1	0	1	0	1	1	1	1	1	0	0	1	1	1	*	2	1	1	16	1	14	4
18	Ganjargal Ganbaatar	Mongolia	GMI	2265	1	1	1	1	0	0	1	1	1	1	1	1	1	1	0	1	0	*	1	1	15	0	15	4
19	Leopold Kouogueu	Cameroon	GMI	2301	0	0	0	1	0	1	1	1	1	1	1	1	1	1	1	1	1	1	*	1	15	0	15	4
20	Frants Forbin	France	MI	2282	0	0	0	1	1	1	0	0	0	0	0	0	1	1	0	0	1	1	1	*	8	0	8	11

== See also ==
- List of Draughts World Championship winners
