= 2024 World Draughts Championship match =

Draughts match between Yuri Anikeev and Jan Groenendijk

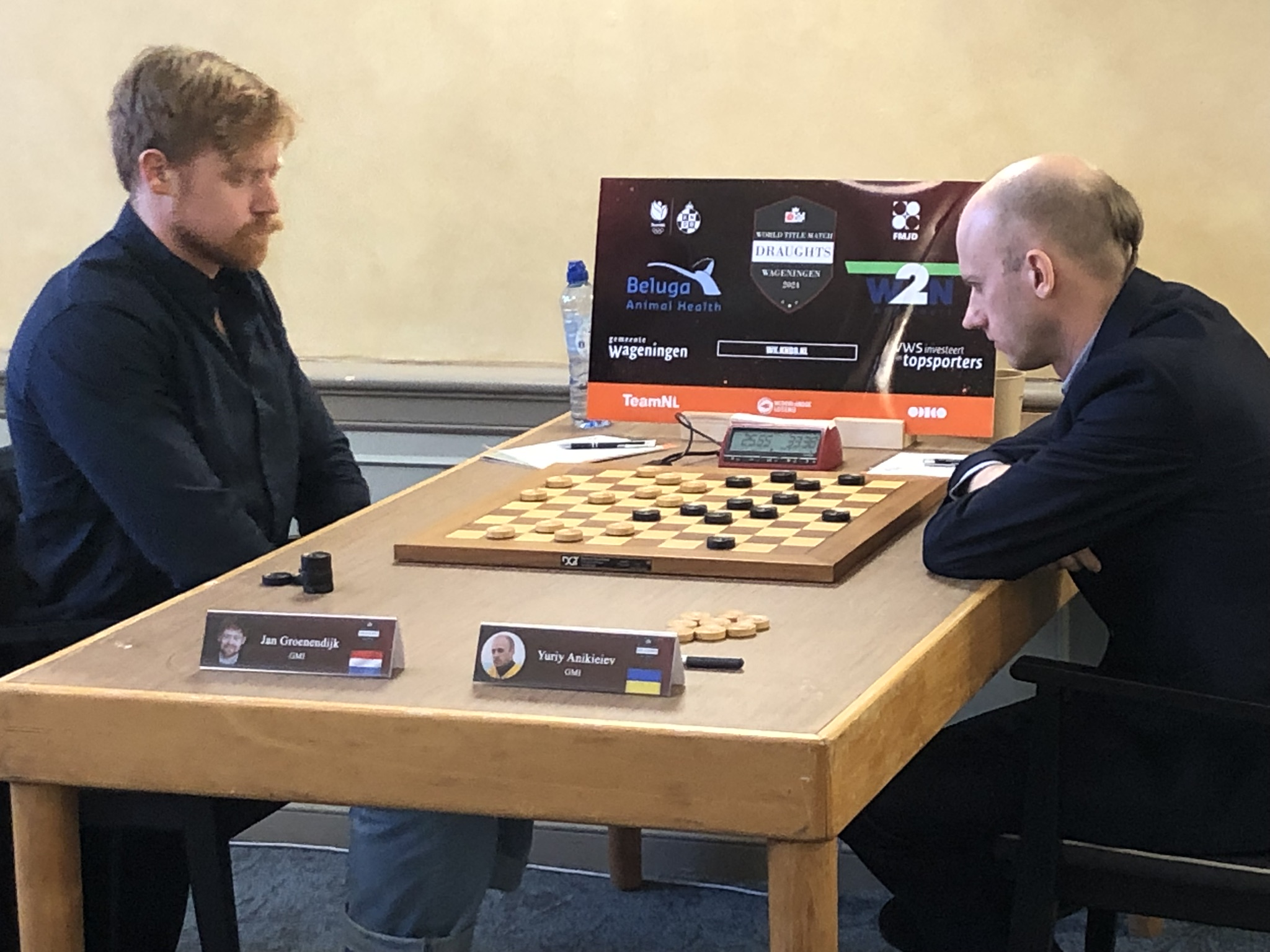
- Jan Groenendijk (left) vs Yuri Anikeev (right)

Tournament information
- Location: Wageningen, Netherlands
- Dates: 18 December–31 December
- Administrator: FMJD
- Tournament format: Match
- Venue: Wageningen City Hall

Final positions
- Champion: Jan Groenendijk

The 2024 World Draughts Championship match was held from 18 to 31 December, 2024, at the Wageningen City Hall in Wageningen, Netherlands. It was held under the auspices of the International Draughts Federation (FMJD) and played between the reigning 2023 world champion, Yuri Anikeev, and the runner-up of the previous championship, Jan Groenendijk.

Jan Groenendijk won the match to capture his first world championship title.

== Rules and regulations ==
The match consisted of 12 games, played with a time control of 90 minutes for the first 45 moves, followed by 30 minutes for the rest of the game plus a 30-second increment per move. The player with the highest score won the world title if he won at least two games. If not, tie-break games were played until one player achieved a second overall win.

The first tie-break was 2 rapid games, 20 minutes plus a 10-second increment per move. The second tie-break was 4 blitz games, 10 minutes plus a 5-second increment per move. The third tie-break was Superblitz (limited time for an unlimited number of games until the first victory), 10 minutes plus a 2-second increment per move.

== Schedule ==
The games started between 10–11 a.m. One classical game was played per day, with no rest days.

Date	Event
18 December	Press conference
19 December	Round 1
20 December	Round 2
21 December	Round 3
22 December	Round 4
23 December	Round 5
24 December	Round 6
25 December	Round 7
26 December	Round 8
27 December	Round 9
28 December	Round 10
29 December	Round 11
30 December	Round 12
31 December	Tie-break

== Results ==
=== Regular games ===
Player	Rating FMJD	1	2	3	4	5	6	7	8	9	10	11	12	Points	Victories
(Netherlands) Jan Groenendijk	2440	1	1	1	1	1	1	1	1	1	1	1	2	13	1
(Ukraine) Yuri Anikeev	2356	1	1	1	1	1	1	1	1	1	1	1	0	11	0

=== Tie-break ===
Player	Rating rapid/blitz FMJD	Rapid game 1	Rapid game 2	Blitz game 1	Blitz game 2	Blitz game 3	Victories	Total victories
(Netherlands) Jan Groenendijk	2423	1	1	1	1	2	1	2
(Ukraine) Yuri Anikeev	2434	1	1	1	1	0	0	0

== See also ==
- Draughts World Championship
