= 2013 World Draughts Championship =

Draughts tournament

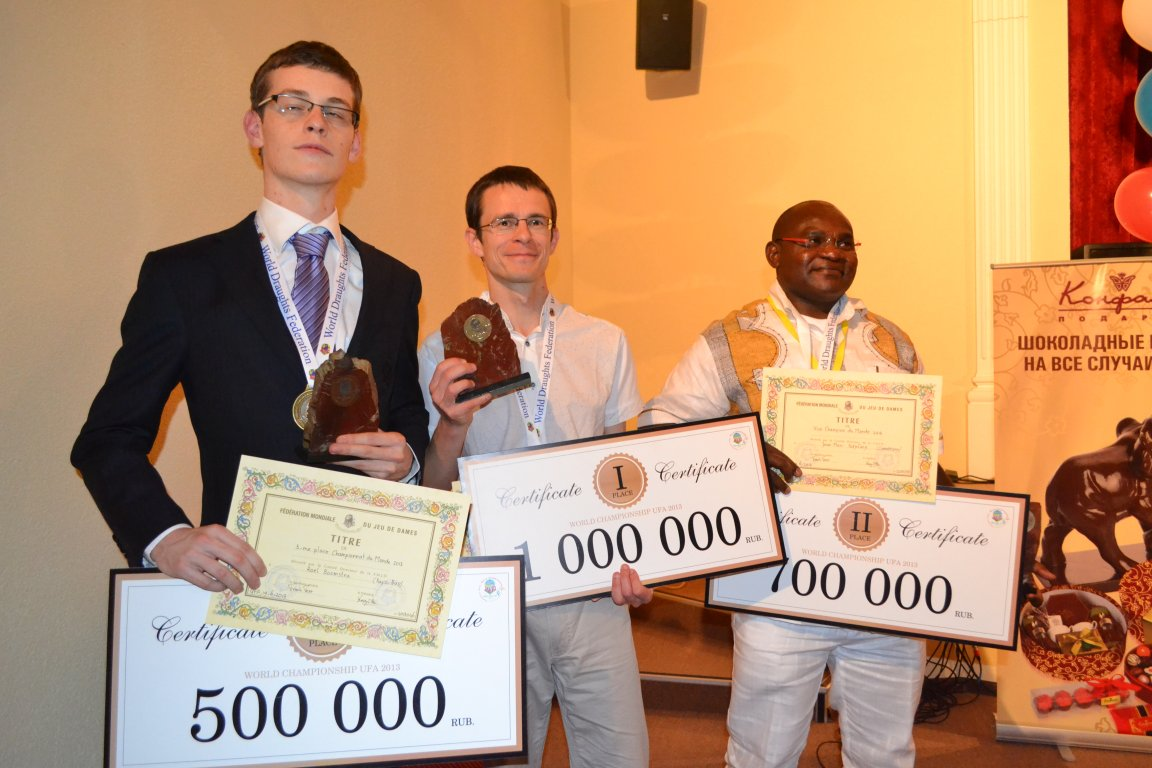
- From left to right: Boomstra (3rd), Georgiev (1st), Ndjofang (2nd)

Tournament information
- Location: Ufa, Russia
- Dates: 2 June–20 June
- Administrator: FMJD
- Tournament format: Round-robin tournament

Final positions
- Champion: Alexander Georgiev
- Runner-up: Jean Marc Ndjofang

The 2013 World Draughts Championship in international draughts was held from 2 to 20 June, 2013 in Ufa, Russia. 40 players from 24 countries who qualified through the championships of Europe, Asia, Africa, and North and South America competed in the tournament. Among them was women's Draughts World Champion Zoja Golubeva from Latvia.

Alexander Georgiev became the World Champion. Jean Marc Ndjofang took second place, and Roel Boomstra took third place.

== Rules and regulations ==
In the first stage, 40 participants were divided into 4 groups named after the world champions Andris Andreiko, Baba Sy, Iser Kuperman, and Marcel Deslauriers. Each group played a round-robin tournament. The top 3 players from each group, 12 players in total, advanced to the final. Other players played in the final B.

The final was played as a round-robin tournament. Matches between players who had already played each other in the group stage did not take place, with the results from the group stage being used instead.

The final rankings were determined by total points. If two or more players finished with the same score, the following tiebreaks were applied:

1. Number of wins.
2. The greatest difference between plus and minus draws.
3. The largest number of plus draws.
4. Results in the direct encounters between the tied players.
5. Results obtained against opponents in order of their final ranking.

In a drawn game where the material difference was 3 or more pieces (with a king counted as 2), the player with the superior material received a plus draw, while the opponent received a minus draw.

== Results ==
=== Semifinal ===
GMI — international grandmaster

MI — international master

MF — master FMJD

GMIF — women's international grandmaster

Advanced to the final

==== Group Andreiko ====
Place	Name	Country	Title	Rating	1	2	3	4	5	6	7	8	9	10	Points	Wins	Draws	Losses	+ Draws	Draws
1.	Alexander Georgiev	Russia	GMI	2445	*	1+	1	1+	1	2	1	2	1+	2	12	3	6	0	3	0
2.	Yuri Anikeev	Ukraine	GMI	2321	1-	*	1	1	1	1	2	1+	2	2	12	3	6	0	1	1
3.	Alexander Getmanski	Russia	GMI	2366	1	1	*	1	1	1	2	1	2	2	12	3	6	0	0	0
4.	Alexander Baljakin	Netherlands	GMI	2370	1-	1	1	*	1	1-	2	1+	2	2	12	3	6	0	1	2
5.	Evgueni Watoetin	Belarus	GMI	2315	1	1	1	1	*	2	1	1	2	1	11	2	7	0	0	0
6.	Ganjargal Ganbaatar	Mongolia	GMI	2287	0	1	1	1+	0	*	1	1	1	2	8	1	6	2	1	0
7.	Oskar Budis	Poland	MF	2104	1	0	0	0	1	1	*	2	0	2	7	2	3	4	0	0
8.	Charles Akoi	Guinea	GMI	2263	0	1-	1	1-	1	1	0	*	1	1	7	0	7	2	0	1
9.	Angel Mejia	Dominican Republic	MF	2284	1-	0	0	0	0	1	2	1	*	0	5	1	3	5	0	2
10.	Yuriy Nossov	Kazakhstan		2234	0	0	0	0	1	0	0	1	2	*	4	1	2	6	0	0

==== Group Baba Sy ====
Place	Name	Country	Title	Rating	1	2	3	4	5	6	7	8	9	10	Points	Wins	Draws	Losses	+ Draws	Draws
1.	Alexander Schwarzman	Russia	GMI	2416	*	1	1	1	1+	1	2	2	2	2	13	4	5	0	1	0
2.	Artem Ivanov	Ukraine	MI	2372	1	*	1-	1+	1	2	1+	2	2	1	12	3	6	0	2	1
3.	Dul Erdenebileg	Mongolia	GMI	2277	1	1+	*	0	1-	2	1	2	1+	2	11	3	5	1	2	1
4.	Thomy Mbongo	Cameroon	MI	2312	1	1-	2	*	1	1	1	0	2	2	11	3	5	1	0	1
5.	Murodoullo Amrillaev	Russia	GMI	2346	1-	1	1+	1	*	1-	1+	2	0	2	10	2	6	1	2	2
6.	Andrei Tolchykov	Belarus	MI	2322	1	0	0	1	1+	*	1+	1	2	2	9	2	5	2	2	0
7.	Zoja Golubeva	Latvia	GMIF	2270	0	1-	1	1	1-	1-	*	1	1	2	9	1	7	1	0	3
8.	Mamoutou Mariko	Mali	MI	2132	0	0	0	2	0	1	1	*	1	1	6	1	4	4	0	0
9.	Dickson Maughn	Trinidad and Tobago	MF	2233	0	0	1-	0	2	0	1	1	*	0	5	1	3	5	0	1
10.	Nicolas Derival	United States	MI	2287	0	1	0	0	0	0	0	1	2	*	4	1	2	6	0	0

==== Group Deslauriers ====
Place	Name	Country	Title	Rating	1	2	3	4	5	6	7	8	9	10	Points	Wins	Draws	Losses	+ Draws	Draws
1.	Adonis Ano	Ivory Coast		2266	*	1-	1-	2	1-	1	1-	2	2	1	12	3	6	0	0	4
2.	Jean Marc Ndjofang	Cameroon	GMI	2336	1+	*	1	1	1	2	1	1	1+	2	11	2	7	0	2	0
3.	Roel Boomstra	Netherlands	GMI	2400	1+	1	*	1	1	1	1	1	2	2	11	2	7	0	1	0
4.	Ainur Shaibakov	Russia	MI	2338	0	1	1	*	1-	2	1	1	1+	2	10	2	6	1	1	1
5.	Guntis Valneris	Latvia	GMI	2395	1+	1	1	1+	*	1	1	1	1-	2	10	1	8	0	2	1
6.	Oscar Lognon	France	MI	2294	1	0	1	0	1	*	1-	2	2	1+	9	2	5	2	1	1
7.	Aleksej Domchev	Lithuania	GMI	2289	1+	1	1	1	1	1+	*	1	1	1	9	0	9	0	2	0
8.	Alisher Artykow	Uzbekistan	MI	2160	0	1	1	1	1	0	1	*	2	1	8	1	6	2	0	0
9.	Vitaliy Stumpf	Germany	MF	2170	0	1-	0	1-	1+	0	1	0	*	1	5	0	5	4	1	2
10.	Djoumber Berichvili	Georgia	MI	2272	1	0	0	0	0	1-	1	1	1	*	5	0	5	4	0	1

==== Group Kuperman ====
Place	Name	Country	Title	Rating	1	2	3	4	5	6	7	8	9	10	Points	Wins	Draws	Losses	+ Draws	Draws
1.	Alexei Chizhov	Russia	GMI	2411	*	1+	1	1	1+	1+	1	2	2	2	12	3	6	0	3	0
2.	Joel Atse	Ivory Coast	GMI	2304	1-	*	1	1+	1	1	2	2	1	2	12	3	6	0	1	1
3.	Edvardas Bužinskis	Lithuania	GMI	2341	1	1	*	0	1	1	1	2	2	1+	10	2	6	1	1	0
4.	Pim Meurs	Netherlands	GMI	2372	1	1-	2	*	1	1	1	2	0	1	10	2	6	1	0	1
5.	Allan Silva	Brazil	GMI	2293	1-	1	1	1	*	1-	1	2	1	1	10	1	8	0	0	1
6.	Raimonds Vipulis	Latvia	GMI	2276	1-	1	1	1	1	*	1-	0	1	2	9	1	7	12	0	2
7.	Yuriy Lagoda	Ukraine	MI	2245	1	0	1	1	1	1+	*	1+	1	1	8	0	8	1	2	0
8.	Farhad Huseynov	Azerbaijan	MI	2221	0	0	0	0	0	2	1-	*	2	2	7	3	1	5	0	1
9.	N'Diaga Samb	Senegal	GMI	2334	0	1	0	2	1	1	1	0	*	1	7	1	5	3	0	0
10.	Zhou Wei	China		2133	0	0	1-	1	1	0	1	0	1	*	5	0	5	4	0	1

=== Final ===
Place	Name	Country	1	2	3	4	5	6	7	8	9	10	11	12	Points	Wins	Draws	Losses	+ Draws	Draws
1.	Alexander Georgiev	Russia	*	1	1	1+	1	2	1	2	2	1+	1	2	15	4	7	0	2	0
2.	Jean Marc Ndjofang	Cameroon	1	*	1	1	2	0	2	0	1+	2	2	2	14	5	4	2	1	0
3.	Roel Boomstra	Netherlands	1	1	*	1-	1	1	1	2	1+	1	2	2	14	3	8	0	1	1
4.	Yuri Anikeev	Ukraine	1-	1	1+	*	1	1	1	1	2	1+	1	2	13	2	9	0	2	1
5.	Alexander Getmanski	Russia	1	0	1	1	*	1	1	2	1+	2	1	1	12	2	8	1	1	0
6.	Alexei Chizhov	Russia	0	1	1	1	1	*	1	1	1	2	1	1	12	2	8	1	1	1
7.	Alexander Schwarzman	Russia	1	0	1	1	1	1	*	2	1+	1	1	1	11	1	9	1	1	0
8.	Joel Atse	Ivory Coast	0	2	0	1	0	1-	0	*	2	1	1	2	10	3	4	4	0	1
9.	Adonis Ano	Ivory Coast	0	1-	1-	0	1-	1+	1-	0	*	1	2	1-	9	1	7	3	1	5
10.	Edvardas Bužinskis	Lithuania	1-	0	1	1-	0	1	1	1	1	*	1	1	9	0	9	2	0	2
11.	Artem Ivanov	Ukraine	1	0	0	1	1	1	1	1	0	1	*	1-	8	0	8	3	0	1
12.	Dul Erdenebileg	Mongolia	0	0	0	0	1	0	1	0	1+	1	1+	*	5	0	5	6	2	0

=== Final B ===
Place	Name	Country	Points	Wins	Draws	Losses
1.	N'Diaga Samb	Senegal	12	3	6	0
2.	Evgueni Watoetin	Belarus	11	2	7	0
3.	Ainur Shaibakov	Russia	11	2	7	0
4.	Thomy Mbongo	Cameroon	11	2	7	0
5.	Murodoullo Amrillaev	Russia	11	2	7	0
6.	Yuriy Lagoda	Ukraine	11	3	5	1
7.	Edmond Beugre	Ivory Coast	10	2	6	1
8.	Tamara Tansykkuzhina	Russia	1	8	0	
9.	Pim Meurs	Netherlands	10	1	8	0
10.	Aleksej Domchev	Belarus	10	1	8	0
11.	Guntis Valneris	Latvia	10	1	8	0
12.	Oscar Lognon	France	10	1	8	0
13.	Andrei Tolchykov	Belarus	10	2	6	1
14.	Allan Silva	Brazil	10	2	6	1
15.	Sergei Kalinov	Russia	10	2	6	1
16.	Ganjargal Ganbaatar	Mongolia	10	2	6	1
17.	Dickson Maughn	Trinidad and Tobago	9	2	5	2
18.	Oskar Budis	Poland	9	2	5	2
19.	Aygul Idrisova	Russia	9	3	3	3
20.	Alisher Artykow	Uzbekistan	8	2	4	3
21.	Farhad Huseynov	Azerbaijan	8	2	4	3
22.	Djoumber Berichvili	Georgia	8	2	4	3
23.	Mamoutou Mariko	Mali	8	2	4	3
24.	Raimonds Vipulis	Latvia	8	0	8	1
25.	Angel Mejia	Dominican Republic	7	3	1	5
26.	Nicolas Derival	United States	7	3	1	5
27.	Vitaliy Stumpf	Germany	7	0	7	2
28.	Regina Ajupova	Russia	6	1	4	4
29.	Airat Nurgaziyev	Kazakhstan	6	0	6	3
30.	Yuriy Nossov	Kazakhstan	3	0	3	6

== See also ==
- List of Draughts World Championship winners
