= 2016 World Draughts Championship match =

Draughts match between Roel Boomstra and Jan Groenendijk

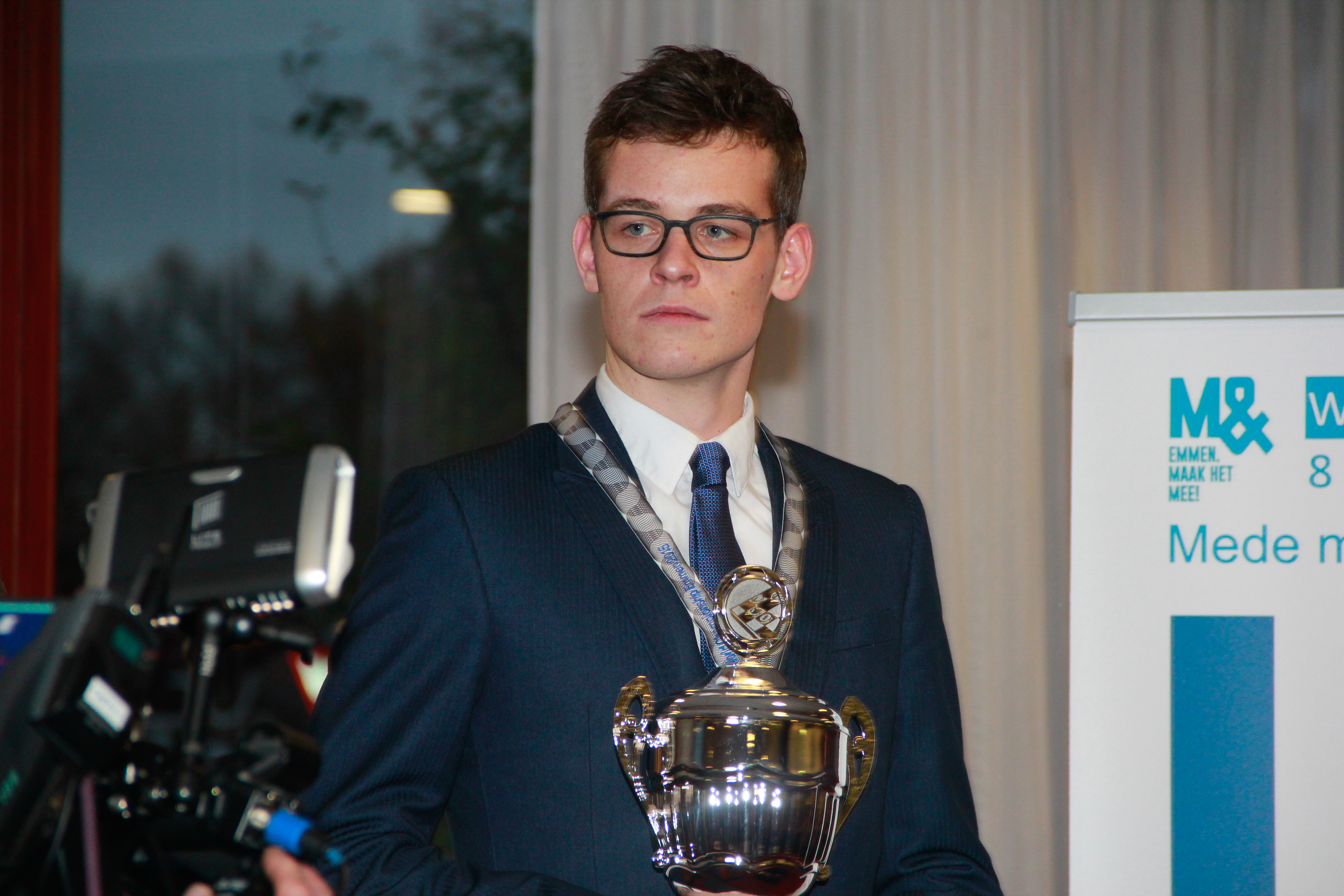
- 2016 World Draughts Champion Roel Boomstra

Tournament information
- Location: The Netherlands
- Dates: 3 December–18 December
- Administrator: FMJD
- Tournament format: Match

Final positions
- Champion: Roel Boomstra

The 2016 World Draughts Championship match in international draughts was held from 3–18 December in the Netherlands under the auspices of the International Draughts Federation (FMJD). Reigning world champion Alexander Georgiev decided not to defend his title, so the match took place between the second and third place finishers of the previous championship, Jan Groenendijk and Roel Boomstra.

Roel Boomstra won the match 16–8 to become World Draughts Champion.

== Results ==
Country	Name	1	2	3	4	5	6	7	8	9	10	11	12	Points
Netherlands	Roel Boomstra	2	1	1	1	2	1	1	2	1	2	1	1	16
Netherlands	Jan Groenendijk	0	1	1	1	0	1	1	0	1	0	1	1	8

== See also ==
- List of Draughts World Championship winners
