= 2013 World Draughts Championship match =

Draughts match between Alexander Georgiev and Alexander Schwarzman

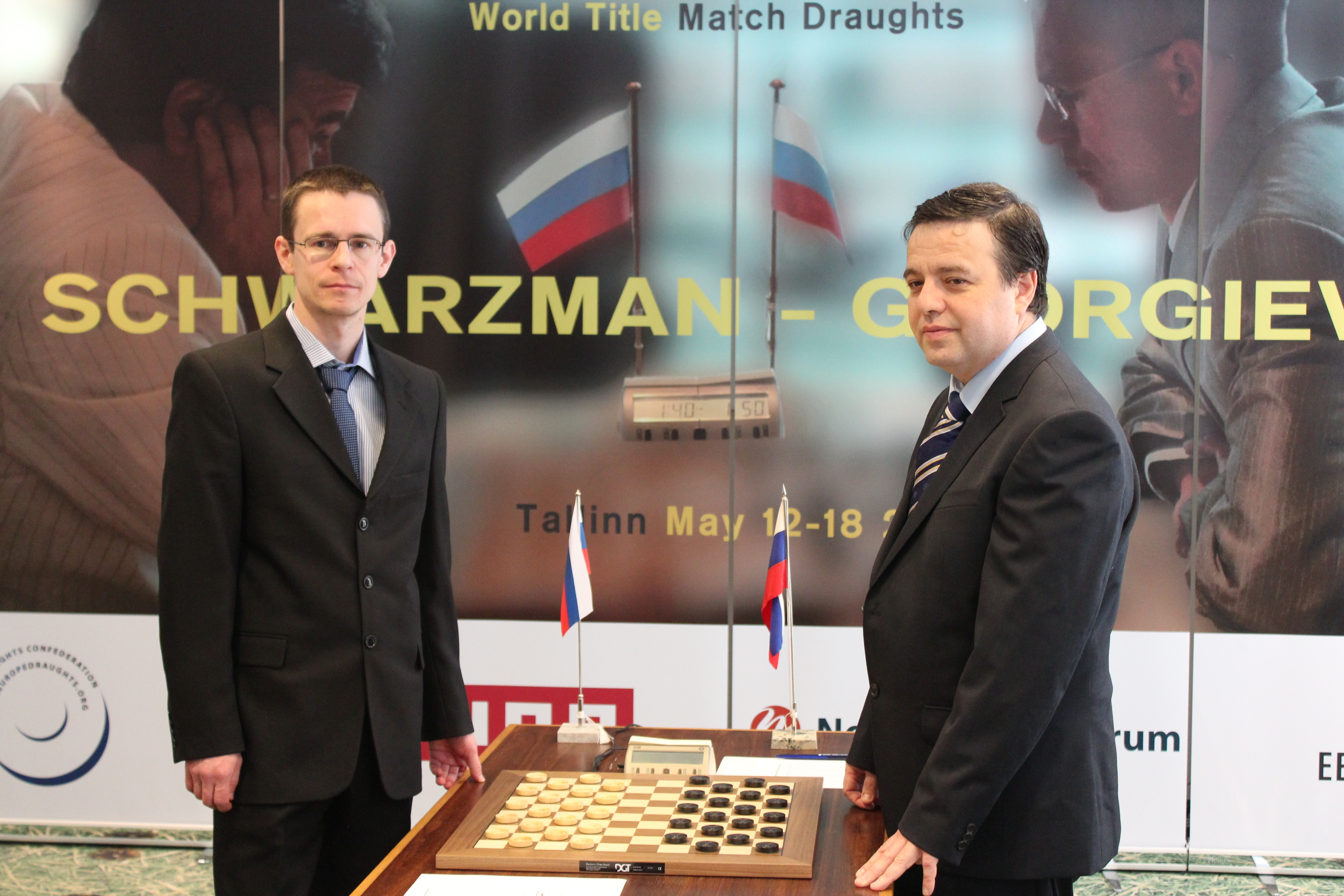
- Georgiev (left) vs Schwarzman (right)

Tournament information
- Location: Tallinn, Estonia
- Dates: 12 May–18 May
- Administrator: FMJD
- Tournament format: Match

Final positions
- Champion: Alexander Georgiev

The 2013 World Draughts Championship match in international draughts was held from 12–18 May 2013 in Tallinn, Estonia. Under the auspices of the International Draughts Federation (FMJD), the match was played between World Champion Alexander Georgiev (Russia) and the challenger Alexander Schwarzman (Russia). Alexander Georgiev won and became the World Champion for the seventh time.

== Rules and regulations ==
The match consisted of seven micro-matches. Each micro-match was played until the first victory. The first game of each micro-match was a standard game, 80 minutes plus a 1-minute increment per move. If the standard game was drawn, a rapid game was played, 20 minutes plus a 5-second increment per move. If the rapid game was drawn, a blitz game was played, 5 minutes plus a 3-second increment per move.

If the blitz game was drawn, Superblitz (limited time for an unlimited number of games until the first victory) was played, with 5 minutes plus a 2-second increment per move.

The final result of each micro-match was determined by the result of the first decisive game. The player who won the most standard games won the match. In case of a tie, the following tie-breaks were used:

1. Rapid score.
2. Blitz score.
3. Superblitz score.

== Results ==
Country	Name	Time control	1	2	3	4	5	6	7	Points
Russia	Alexander Georgiev	Classic	1	1	0	2	1	1	1	7
Russia	Alexander Schwarzman	Classic	1	1	2	0	1	1	1	7
Russia	Alexander Georgiev	Rapid	1	1			1	2	1	6
Russia	Alexander Schwarzman	Rapid	1	1			1	0	1	4
Russia	Alexander Georgiev	Blitz	0	1			1		2	4
Russia	Alexander Schwarzman	Blitz	2	1			1		0	4
Russia	Alexander Georgiev	Superblitz		2			0			2
Russia	Alexander Schwarzman	Superblitz		0			2			2
Russia	Alexander Georgiev	Total	1-1-0	2-2-1-2	2-2-1-2	4-2-1-2	5-3-2-2	6-5-2-2	7-6-4-2	7-6-4-2
Russia	Alexander Schwarzman	Total	1-1-2	2-2-3-0	4-2-3-0	4-2-3-0	5-3-4-2	6-3-4-2	7-4-4-2	7-4-4-2
		Leading:	Schwarzman	Schwarzman	Schwarzman	Schwarzman	Schwarzman	Georgiev	Georgiev	Georgiev

== See also ==
- List of Draughts World Championship winners
