= 2015 World Draughts Championship match =

Draughts match between Alexander Georgiev and Jean Marc Ndjofang

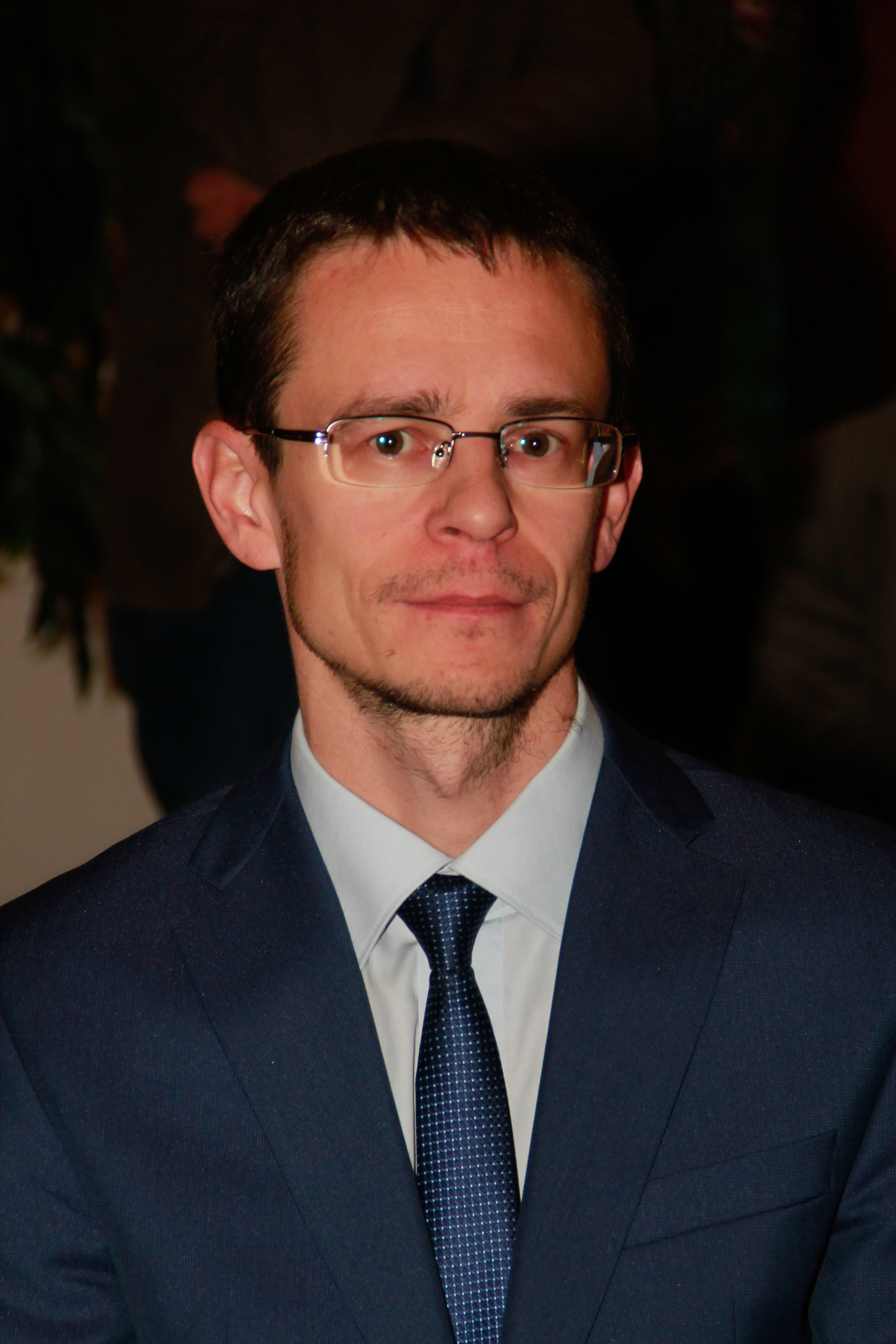
- 2015 World Draughts Champion Alexander Georgiev

Tournament information
- Location: İzmir, Turkey
- Dates: 25 October–31 October
- Administrator: FMJD
- Tournament format: Match
- Venue: Hotel Armis

Final positions
- Champion: Alexander Georgiev

The 2015 World Draughts Championship match in international draughts was held from 25–31 October, 2015 at the Hotel Armis in İzmir, Turkey. It was played under the auspices of the International Draughts Federation (FMJD) between the defending world champion Alexander Georgiev (Russia) and the challenger Jean Marc Ndjofang (Cameroon). Alexander Georgiev won 7-7-6-6 against 7-5-4-12 to become the world champion for the eighth time.

== Rules and regulations ==
The match consisted of seven micro-matches. Each micro-match was played until the first victory. The first game of each micro-match was a standard game, 80 minutes plus a 1-minute increment per move. If the standard game was drawn, a rapid game was played, 20 minutes plus a 5-second increment per move. If the rapid game was drawn, a blitz game was played, 5 minutes plus a 3-second increment per move.

If the blitz game was drawn, Superblitz (limited time for an unlimited number of games until the first victory) was played, with 5 minutes plus a 2-second increment per move.

The final result of each micro-match was determined by the result of the first decisive game. The player who won the most standard games won the match. In case of a tie, the following tie-breaks were used:

1. Rapid score.
2. Blitz score.
3. Superblitz score.

== Results ==
Country	Name	Games system	1	2	3	4	5	6	7	Points
Russia	Alexander Georgiev	Classic	1	1	1	1	1	1	1	7
Cameroon	Jean Marc Ndjofang	Classic	1	1	1	1	1	1	1	7
Russia	Alexander Georgiev	Rapid	1	2	1	1	1	1		7
Cameroon	Jean Marc Ndjofang	Rapid	1	0	1	1	1	1		5
Russia	Alexander Georgiev	Blitz	1		1	1	2	1		6
Cameroon	Jean Marc Ndjofang	Blitz	1		1	1	0	1		4
Russia	Alexander Georgiev	Superblitz	1-1; 1-1; 0-2		1-1; 1-1; 1-1; 0-2	1-1; 0-2				6
Cameroon	Jean Marc Ndjofang	Superblitz	1-1; 1-1; 2-0		1-1; 1-1; 1-1; 2-0	1-1; 2-0				12
Russia	Alexander Georgiev	Total	1-1-1-2	1-2	1-1-1-3	1-1-1-1	1-1-2	1-1-1	1-1	7-7-6-6
Cameroon	Jean Marc Ndjofang	Total	1-1-1-4	1-0	1-1-1-5	1-1-1-3	1-1-0	1-1-1	1-1	7-5-4-12

== See also ==
- List of Draughts World Championship winners
