= Artem Ivanov (draughts player) =

Ukrainian draughts grandmaster (born 1988)

Personal information
- Born: April 5, 1988 (age 38)

Sport
- Country: Ukraine
- Sport: Draughts
- Rank: Grandmaster (2015)

Achievements and titles
- Highest world ranking: No. 5 (October 2016)
- Personal best: 2388 (October 2016, rating)

Artem Ivanov (born April 5, 1988) is a Ukrainian player in the International draughts and draughts-64. He won European championship 2015 in rapid, many times champion of Ukraine in International draughts and draughts-64. International Grandmaster (GMI).

== World Championship ==
=== International draughts ===
- 2013 (11 place)
- 2015 (4 place)
- 2017 (12 place)
- 2021 (7 place)
- 2023 (6 place)

== European Championship ==
=== International draughts ===
- 2008 (18 place)
- 2010 (14 place)
- 2012 (12 place)
- 2014 (14 place)
- 2016 (12 place)
- 2022 (15 place)
- 2024 (8 place)
