= Pan American Draughts Championship =

The Pan American Draughts Championship is an international draughts competition held every two years. The top two finishers qualify for the World Draughts Championship when it has 20 players, and the top four when it has 40.

The first championship took place in 1980, won by Bernard Robillard from Haiti.

Allan Silva from Brazil is the player with the most titles, winning the championship 5 times. Iser Kuperman from the United States has won the second most, with 4.

The first women's championship took place in 2018, won by Lublyana Turiy from United States.

== Results ==
=== Classical ===
Year	Place	Winner
1980	Paramaribo, Suriname	(Haiti) Bernard Robillard
1981	Port-au-Prince, Haiti	(United States) Vladimir Kaplan
1983	Philadelphia, United States	(United States) Iser Kuperman
1985	Ituiutaba, Brazil	(United States) Iser Kuperman
1987	Amparo, Brazil	(United States) Iser Kuperman
1992	Willemstad, Curaçao	(United States) Alexander Mogiljansky
1994	Goiânia, Brazil	(Suriname) Guno Burleson
1995	Águas de Lindóia, Brazil	(United States) Iser Kuperman
1997	Paramaribo, Suriname	(Suriname) Guno Burleson
1999	Willemstad, Curaçao	(Curaçao) Johan Koster
2002	Saint Andrew, Grenada	(United States) Vladimir Veytsman
2003	Cap-Haïtien, Haiti	(Haiti) Anthony Alexandre
2005	Montreal, Canada	(United States) Alexander Mogiljansky
2007	São Paulo, Brazil	(Haiti) Ricardo Pierre
2009	Sao Caetano do Sul, Brazil	(Haiti) Ricardo Pierre
2011	Willemstad, Curaçao	(Brazil) Allan Silva
2013	Port of Spain, Trinidad and Tobago	(Brazil) Allan Silva
2015	São Sebastião, Brazil	(Brazil) Allan Silva
2016	Águas de Lindóia, Brazil	(Brazil) Allan Silva
2018	Willemstad, Curaçao	(Suriname) Guno Burleson
2022	Santo Domingo, Dominican Republic	(Haiti) Makendy Saint Juste
2024	San José, Costa Rica	(Brazil) Allan Silva

=== Blitz ===
Year	Place	Winner
2022	Santo Domingo, Dominican Republic	(Haiti) Makendy Saint Juste
2024	San José, Costa Rica	(Brazil) Allan Silva

=== Women ===
Year	Place	Winner
2018	Willemstad, Curaçao	(United States) Lublyana Turiy
2022	Santo Domingo, Dominican Republic	(United States) Galina Petukhova
2024	San José, Costa Rica	(Brazil) Carla Assuncao Calasans
