= Jan Groenendijk (draughts player) =

Dutch draughts grandmaster (born 1998)

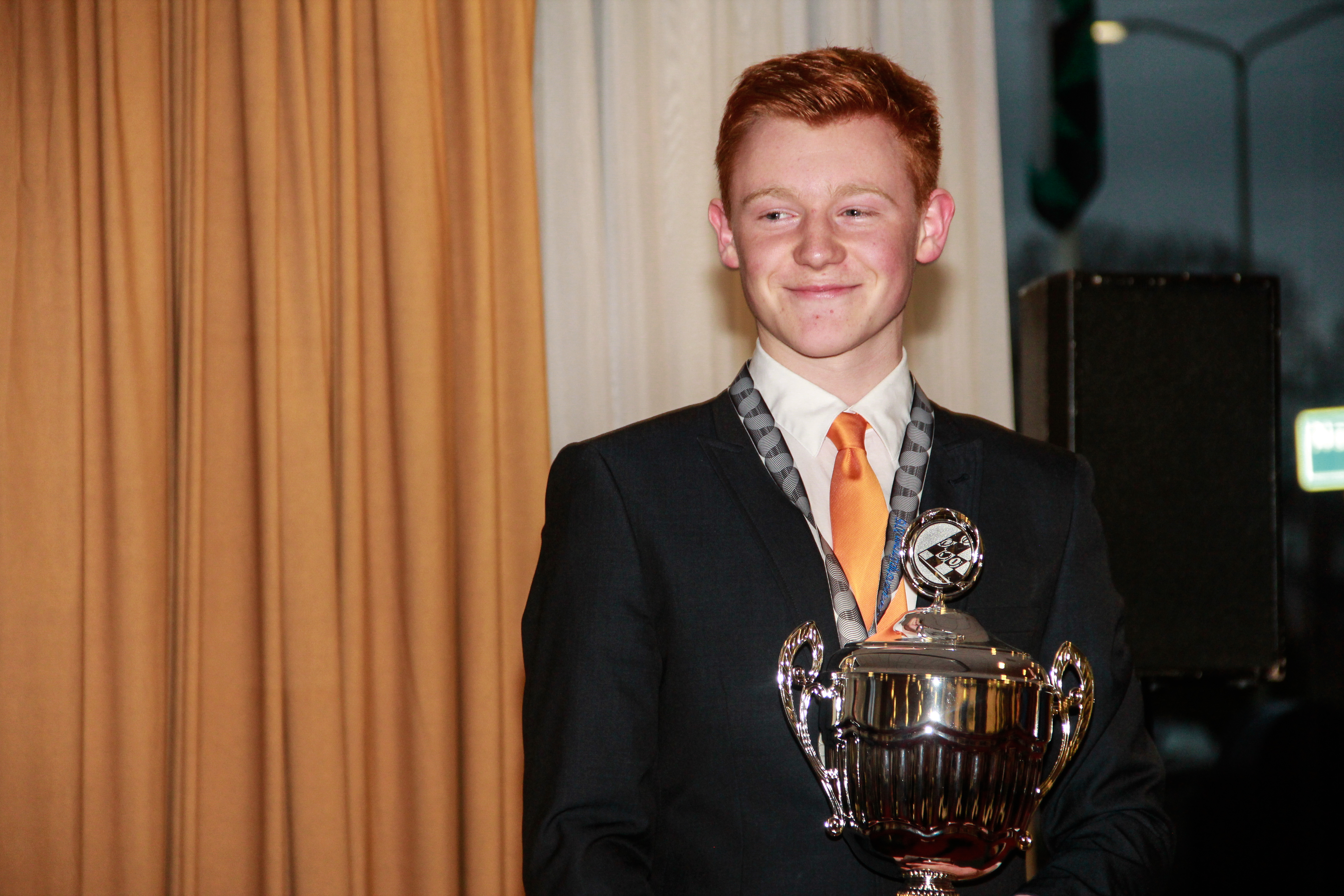
- Groenendijk at the 2015 World Championship

Personal information
- Born: 7 September 1998 (age 27) Wageningen, Netherlands

Sport
- Country: Netherlands
- Sport: Draughts
- Rank: Grandmaster (2016)

Achievements and titles
- Highest world ranking: No. 1 (July 2024)
- Personal best: 2458 (January 2025, rating)

Jan Groenendijk (born 7 September 1998) is a Dutch draughts grandmaster and the reigning Draughts World Champion. He is a two-time world champion, winning the title in 2024 and 2025. Groenendijk has won the European Draughts Championship twice, (2022, 2024), the Salou Open (2015), and the Dutch championship five times (2020, 2022, 2023, 2024, 2025).

== World championship ==
- 2015 (2nd place)
- 2016 match (2nd place)
- 2017 (7th place in semifinal B)
- 2019 (4th place)
- 2021 (4th place)
- 2023 (2nd place)
- 2024 match (1st place)
- 2025 (1st place)

== European championship ==
- 2012 (26th place)
- 2014 (9th place)
- 2018 (11th place)
- 2022 (1st place)
- 2024 (1st place)

== Winner of international tournaments ==
- Salou Open 2015
- Polish Open 2018
- Abidjan Open 2019
- RotterDams Open 2023
- Drancy Open 2023
- Nijmegen Open 2017, 2023
- Riga Open 2023, 2026
- Bourges Open 2026
