= African Draughts Championship =

The African Draughts Championship is the African championship in international draughts, organised by the World Draughts Federation and African Draughts Confederation. The top four finishers qualify for the World Draughts Championship when it has 20 players, and the top six when it has 40.

== History ==
The first championship took place in 1980, won by Bassirou Ba from Senegal. The first blitz championship took place in 2014, won by Jean Marc Ndjofang from Cameroon.

The first women's championship took place in 2018, won by Biagne Elsa Negbre from Ivory Coast.

== Results ==
=== Classical ===
Year	Place	Champion	Silver	Bronze
1980	(Senegal) Dakar	(Senegal) Bassirou Ba	(Senegal) Ameth Diaw	(Ivory Coast) Issa Traore
1982	(Ivory Coast) Abidjan	(Ivory Coast) Djedje Patrice Kouassi	(Ivory Coast) Issa Traore	(Senegal) Bassirou Ba
1984	(Senegal) Dakar	(Senegal) Habib Kane	(Mali) Mamina Ndiaye	(Senegal) As Malick El Diallo
1985	(Guinea) Conakry	(Senegal) Habib Kane	(Senegal) Macodou Ndiaye	(Mali) Mamina Ndiaye
1988	(Mali) Bamako	(Senegal) Macodou Ndiaye	(Mali) Mamina Ndiaye	
1990	(Mali) Bamako	(Senegal) Macodou Ndiaye	(Mali) Souleymane Bah	(Mali) Mamina Ndiaye
1992	(Ivory Coast) Abidjan	(Senegal) Macodou Ndiaye	(Senegal) N'Diaga Samb	(Ivory Coast) Issa Traore
1994	(Senegal) Dakar	(Senegal) Macodou Ndiaye	(Senegal) Bassirou Ba	(Mali) Daouda Diakhite
1996	(Ivory Coast) Abidjan	(Senegal) Bassirou Ba	(Senegal) Gaoussou Sidibe	(Mali) Hamadou Zeba
2000	(Cameroon) Yaoundé	(Cameroon) Jean Marc Ndjofang	(Cameroon) Leopold Kouoguéu	(Senegal) As Malick El Diallo
2003	(Senegal) Dakar	(Senegal) Bassirou Ba	(Cameroon) Leopold Kouoguéu	(Senegal) N'Diaga Samb
2006	(Cameroon) Yaoundé	(Cameroon) Leopold Kouoguéu	(Senegal) N'Diaga Samb	(Cameroon) Jean Marc Ndjofang
2009	(The Gambia) Banjul	(Senegal) Macodou Ndiaye	(Cameroon) Jean Marc Ndjofang	(Senegal) N'Diaga Samb
2010	(Mali) Bamako	(Cameroon) Jean Marc Ndjofang	(Senegal) Mor Seck	(Senegal) N'Diaga Samb
2012	(Burkina Faso) Ouagadougou	(Ivory Coast) Joel N'cho Atse	(Guinea) Charles Akoi	(Democratic Republic of the Congo) Thomy Mbongo
2014	(Niger) Niamey	(Democratic Republic of the Congo) Freddy Loko	(Senegal) N'Diaga Samb	(Cameroon) Jean Marc Ndjofang
2016	(Mali) Bamako	(Senegal) N'Diaga Samb	(Democratic Republic of the Congo) Alain Bukasa	(Cameroon) Jean Marc Ndjofang
2018	(Senegal) Thiès	(Ivory Coast) Joel N'cho Atse	(Senegal) N'Diaga Samb	(Cameroon) Landry Nga
2022	(Mali) Bamako	(Ivory Coast) Joel N'cho Atse	(Democratic Republic of the Congo) Mukendi Reagan Lutete	(Ivory Coast) Adonis Joachim Ano
2024	(Burkina Faso) Ouagadougou	(Republic of the Congo) Tardorel Itoua	(Republic of the Congo) Cesar Mouanda	(Ivory Coast) Joel N'cho Atse

=== Blitz ===
Year	Place	Champion	Silver	Bronze
2014	(Niger) Niamey	(Cameroon) Jean Marc Ndjofang	(Ivory Coast) Joel N'cho Atse	
2016	(Mali) Bamako	(Cameroon) Jean Marc Ndjofang	(Cameroon) Landry Nga	(Ivory Coast) Joel N'cho Atse
2018	(Senegal) Thiès	(Cameroon) Jean Marc Ndjofang	(Ivory Coast) Joel N'cho Atse	(Cameroon) Landry Nga
2022	(Mali) Bamako	(Ivory Coast) Joel N'cho Atse	(Ivory Coast) Adonis Joachim Ano	(Democratic Republic of the Congo) Mukendi Reagan Lutete
2024	(Burkina Faso) Ouagadougou	(Ivory Coast) Joel N'cho Atse	(Cameroon) Landry Nga	(Republic of the Congo) Cesar Mouanda

=== Women's ===
Year	Place	Champion	Silver	Bronze
2018	(Ivory Coast) Abidjan	(Ivory Coast) Biagne Elsa Negbre	(Ivory Coast) Ahondjo Darlene Sotchi	(Ivory Coast) Marie-Pascale Lorougnon
