= Villem Lüüs =

Estonian draughts player and referee (1971–2020)

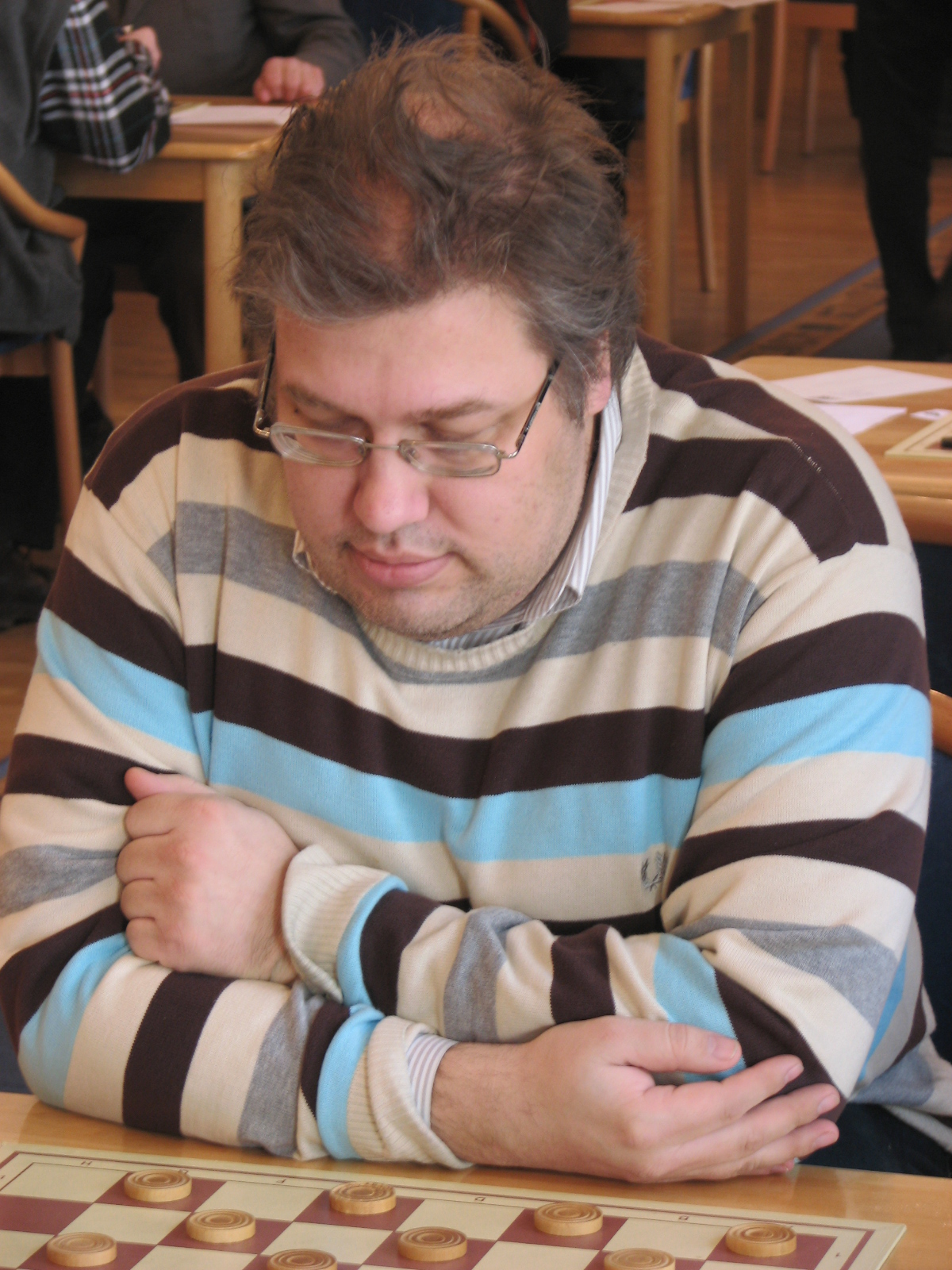
Villem Lüüs Photo: Ave Maria Mõistlik, April 9, 2011

Villem Lüüs (29 March 1971 – 12 November 2020) was an Estonian draughts player and World Draughts Federation master.

== Career ==
Villem Lüüs was born in Tallinn. His mother was interior architect Karin Lüüs. His grandfather, Lembit Lüüs, was a lawyer and Minister of Social Affairs of the Estonian SSR. His grandmother was graphic designer Ella Lüüs. He graduated from Tallinn 1st Secondary School (now the Gustav Adolf Grammar School). After graduating he studied physics at Tartu University.

He was several times Estonian champion in Brazilian, English and International draughts.

In 1992 he was Estonian champion in Brazilian draughts, and in 1994 he was Estonian champion in English draughts. In 2000 he was a member of the team that obtained 6th place as a team at the Draughts Olympics, with Urmo Ilves and Kaido Leesmann. In the same year and again in 2005 he was Estonian champion in international draughts, and in 2010 he was Estonian champion in Russian draughts. In 2018 European championships international draughts he achieved 34. place with 9 points in classic tournament and 32. place with 6 points in superblitz tournament. In 2020 he achieved 4th place at the World Championships for Corresponding Draughts.

He was also a draughts referee. The direction of European Teams Championships 2019 in draughts was entrusted to Villem Lüüs, he was assisted by Alessio Mecca.

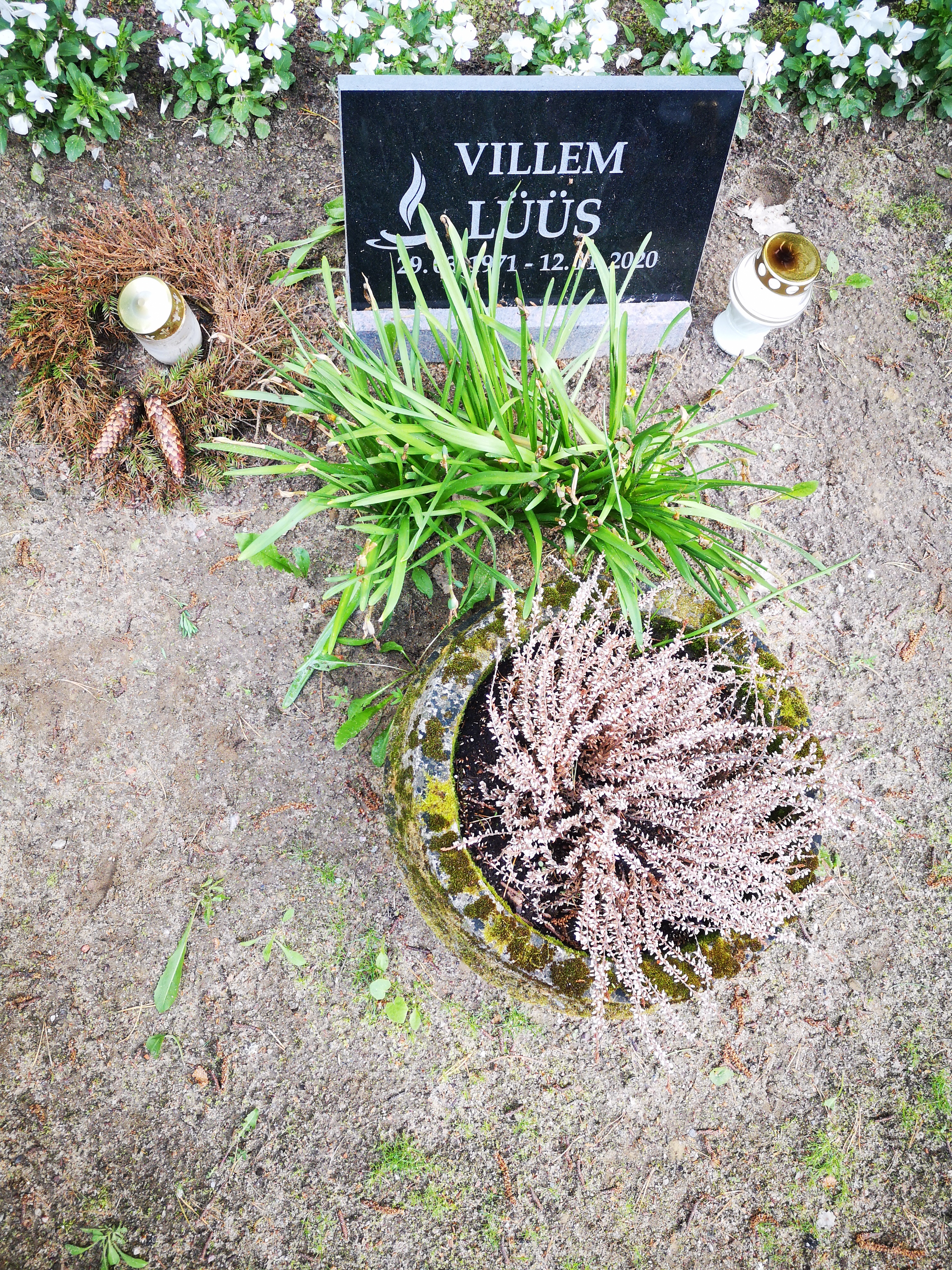
Villem Lüüs' grave at Rahumäe Cemetery in the Nõmme district of Tallinn
