= Dul Erdenebileg =

Mongolian draughts grandmaster (born 1978)

Personal information
- Born: May 14, 1978 (age 48)

Sport
- Country: Mongolia
- Sport: Draughts
- Rank: Grandmaster (2011)

Achievements and titles
- Highest world ranking: No. 29 (October 2007)
- Personal best: 2341 (October 2005, rating)

Dul Erdenebileg (14 May 1978) is a Mongolian draughts player and four-time Asian champion. In 2013 he placed twelfth at the Draughts World Championship.

== World Championship ==
- 2003 (18th place)
- 2005 (5th place in semifinal group B)
- 2011 (14th place)
- 2013 (12th place)
- 2015 (17th place)
- 2017 (5th place in semifinal)
