= Edvardas Bužinskis =

Lithuanian draughts grandmaster (born 1957)

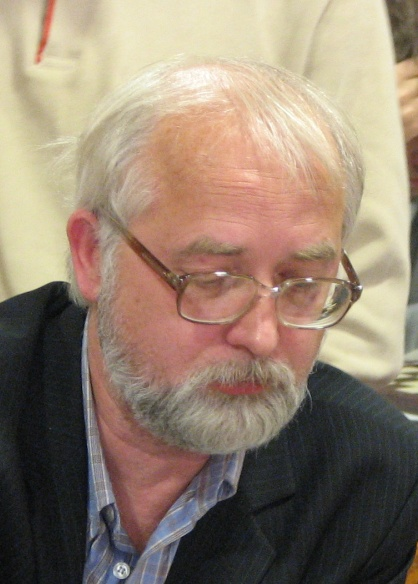
- Bužinskis in 2007

Personal information
- Born: October 8, 1957 (age 68)

Sport
- Country: Lithuania
- Sport: Draughts
- Rank: Grandmaster (1993)

Achievements and titles
- Highest world ranking: No. 12 (January 2009)
- Personal best: 2366 (April 2009, rating)

Edvard Buzinskij (Lithuanian: Edvardas Bužinskis; born October 8, 1957) is a Soviet and Lithuanian draughts player (International draughts), draughts journalist and coach, author of books on draughts. He took third place at European Championship in 2008 and is the winner of European Championship Veterans in 2007 and 2008 and International grandmaster (GMI).

== World Championship ==
- 1992 (12 place)
- 1996 (8 place)
- 2005 (11 place)
- 2011 (17 place)
- 2013 (10 place)
- 2025 (13 place)

== European Championship ==
- 1995 (4 place)
- 1999 (4 place)
- 2002 (6 place)
- 2008 (3 place)
- 2010 (4 place)
- 2012 (10 place)
- 2014 (17 place)

== Soviet Championship ==
- 1974 (2 place) in Championship for junior
- 1977 (15 place)
- 1984(10 place)
- 1985 (9 place)
- 1986 (10 place)
- 1987 (6 place)
- 1988 (17 place)

== Books ==
- Эдвард Зенонович Бужинский, Яков Лейбович Шаус, «Теория и практика международных шашек», Москва, Физкультура и спорт, 1985
- E.Buzhinsky / G.Leibovich, International Draughts. The Tactical Game. Part I. Classic Positions, Vilnius
- E.Buzhinsky / G.Leibovich, International Draughts. The Tactical Game. Positions with the Draught 27 (24), Vilnius, 1991
- Edward Burzyński, Strategia i taktyka w warcabach, Szczecin, Warcpol, 1997 ISBN 83-905619-9-9
- Edward Burzyński, Warcabowe abecadlo. Draughts Alphabet, Szczecin, Warcpol, 2000 ISBN 83-905619-7-2
- Edward Burzyński, Cudowny świat warcabów. Książka dla przyszłych mistrzów. Szczecin, Warcpol, 2005 ISBN 83-918541-1-6
- Edward Burzyński, Dámajáték lépésről lépésre, (raamatu «Warcabowe abecadlo tõlge ungari keelde). Zalaegerszeg, 2005
- Edward Burzyński, Warcabowe abecadlo, (raamatu teine, täiendatud ja parandatud trükk), Szczecin, PC-BEST, 2010 ISBN 978-83-924787-3-7
