= Allan Igor Moreno Silva =

Brazilian draughts grandmaster (born 1992)

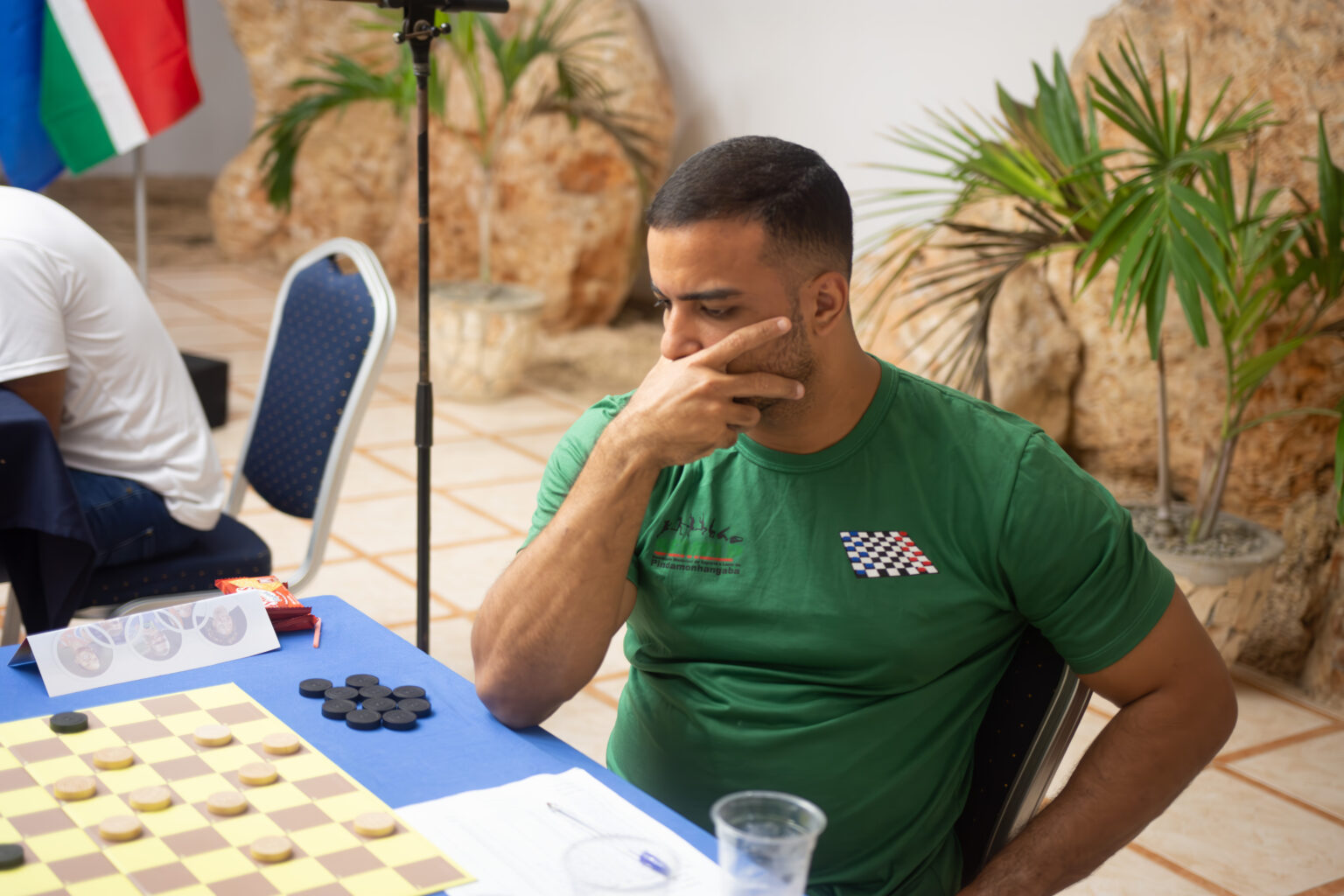

Personal information
- Born: August 6, 1992 (age 34) São Luís, Maranhão, Brazil

Sport
- Country: Brazil
- Sport: Draughts
- Rank: Grandmaster (2011)

Achievements and titles
- Highest world ranking: No. 15 (October 2025)
- Personal best: 2355 (January 2026, rating)

Allan Igor Moreno Silva (born August 6, 1992) is a Brazilian player in the International draughts. He won Panamerican championship in 2011, 2013, 2015, 2016 and 2024, champion of Brazil in International draughts 2015. International Grandmaster (GMI). His father is multiple champion of Brazil International Master Jose Maria Silva Filho.

== World Championship ==
=== International draughts ===
- 2011 (18 place)
- 2013 (14 place in final B)
- 2015 (10 place)
- 2019 (11 place)

== Panamerican Championship ==
=== International draughts ===
- 2011 (1 place)
- 2013 (1 place)
- 2015 (1 place)
- 2016 (1 place)
- 2018 (2 place)
- 2024 (1 place)
- 2024 blitz (1 place)

== International tournaments ==
- 2016: Salou Open (2 place in blitz)
