= Arnaud Cordier =

French draughts grandmaster (born 1974)

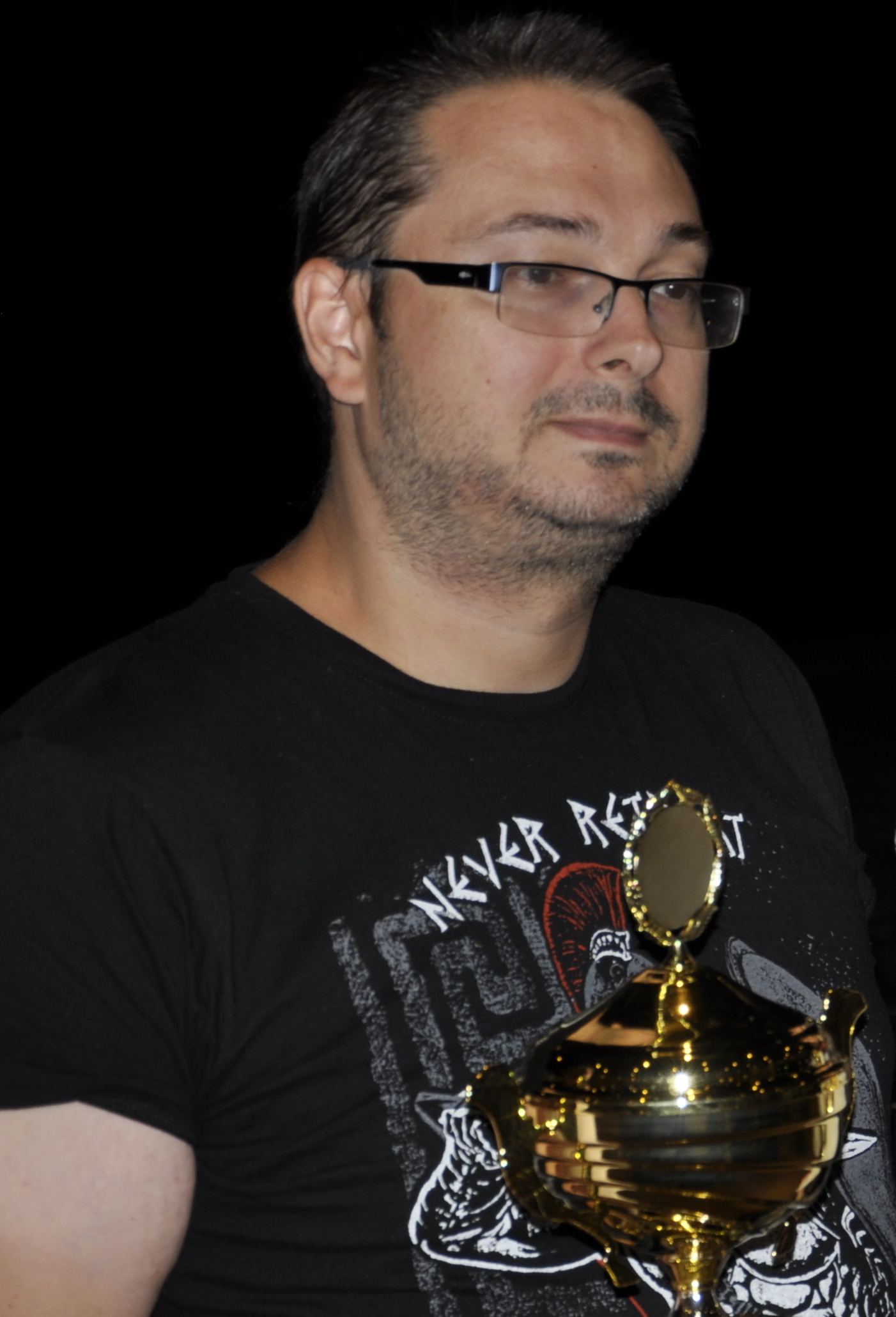

Personal information
- Born: November 26, 1974 (age 51) Dijon, France

Sport
- Country: France
- Sport: Draughts
- Rank: Grandmaster (2006)

Achievements and titles
- National finals: France championships: 1996-1998, 2000, 2001, 2005, 2007, 2008, 2010-2016, 2018, 2022-2024. champion (International draughts)
- Highest world ranking: No. 9 (October 2019)
- Personal best: 2377 (April 2006, rating)
Medal record
European Championships
| Bronze medal – third place | Tallinn 2014 | International draughts |

Arnaud Cordier (born November 26, 1974) is a French draughts player who ranked third at the 2014 European championships international draughts in Tallinn at the 2014, has been French national champion multiple times, from 1996 to 2024. He is currently France's top-rated player.
