= Alexander Georgiev =

Russian draughts grandmaster (born 1975)

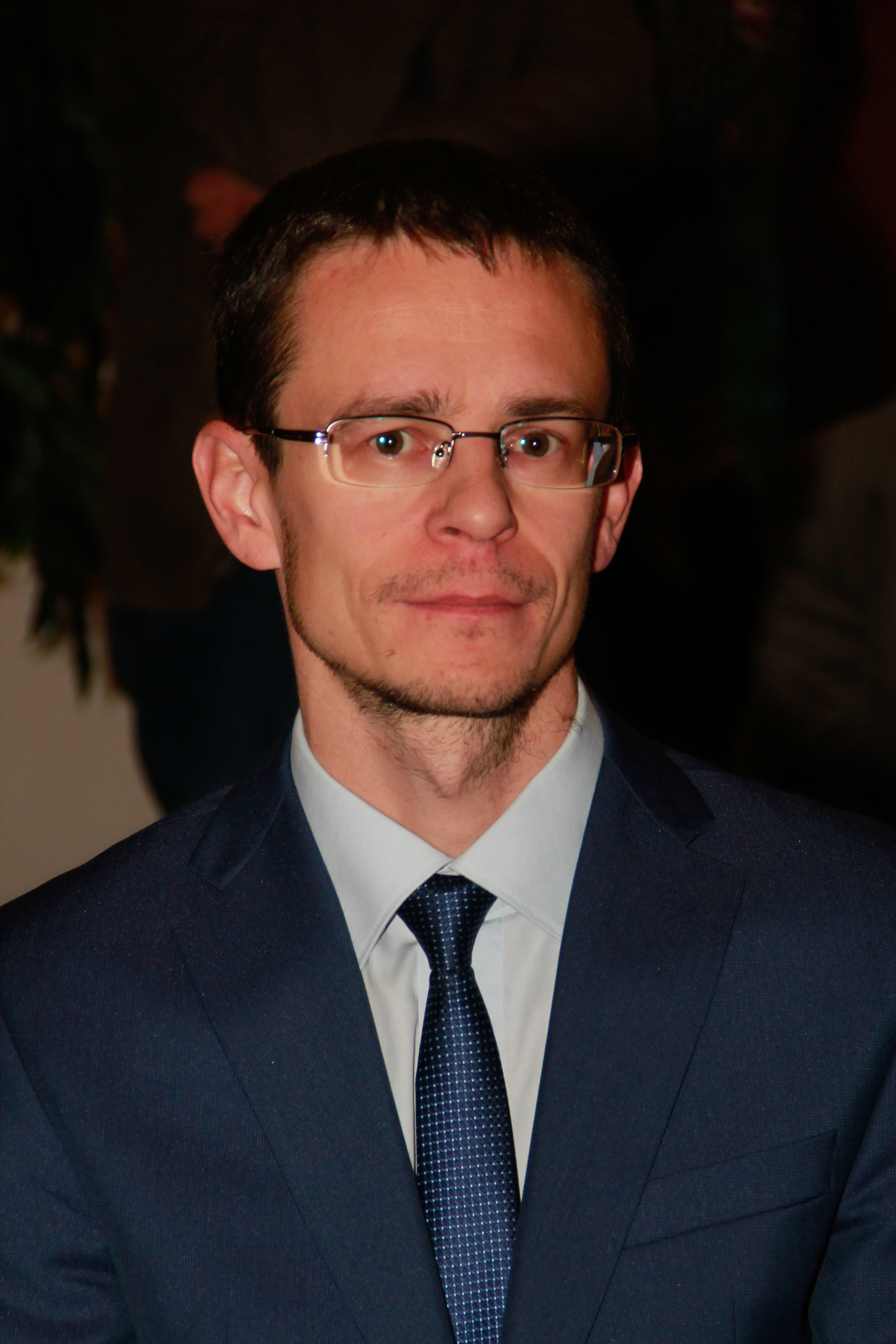
- Georgiev at the Draughts World Championship 2015

Personal information
- Full name: Alexander Sergeyevich Georgiev
- Nationality: Russian
- Born: 17 July 1975 (age 51) Pyatilipy, Novgorod Oblast, USSR

Sport
- Country: Russia
- Sport: International draughts
- Rank: Grandmaster (1996)
- Club: Bashneft (Russia); Mo&Z Volendam (Netherlands)

Achievements and titles
- World finals: Gold: 15
- Regional finals: Gold: 3
- Highest world ranking: No. 1 (July 2003)
- Personal best: 2472 (July 2003, rating)

Alexander Sergeyevich Georgiev (Russian: Александр Серге́евич Георгиев; born 17 July 1975) is a Russian draughts player. He won the world championship in international draughts in 2002, 2003, 2004, 2006, 2011, 2013 (two time), 2015 (two time), 2019. In 2018 he was second at the world championship in Frisian draughts. Russian national champion (13 times).

== Participation in World and European Championships ==
Year	Competition	Location	tournament/ match	Result	Place
1995	EC	(Poland) Lubliniec	tournament	+12 =7 −0	1
1996	WC	(Ivory Coast) Abidjan	tournament	+3 =7 −1	4
1999	EC	(Netherlands) Hoogezand	tournament	+4 =7 −4	8
2001	WC	(Russia) Moscow	tournament	+4 =10 −2	7
2002	EC	(Netherlands) Domburg	tournament (play-off)		2
2003	WC	(Russia) Yakutsk	match with (Russia) Alexei Chizhov	+4 −1	1
2003	WC	(Netherlands) Zwartsluis	tournament	+6 =13 −0	1 *
2004	WC	(Russia) Ufa / Izhevsk	match with (Russia) Alexei Chizhov	+4 −1	1
2005	WC	(Netherlands) Amsterdam	tournament	+1 =9 −1 **	9
2006	WC	(Russia) Yakutsk	match with (Russia) Alexei Chizhov		1
2006	EC	(Slovenia) Bovec	tournament (Swiss system)	+4 =6 −0	1
2007	WC	(Netherlands) Hardenberg	tournament	+5 =14 −0	3
2008	EC	(Estonia) Tallinn	tournament (Swiss system)	+3 =6 −0	2
2009	WC	(Netherlands)	match with (Russia) Alexander Schwarzman		2 ***
2010	EC	(Poland) Zakopane	tournament (Swiss system)	+4 =5 −0	1
2011	WC	(Netherlands) Emmeloord / Urk	tournament	+7 =12 −0	1
2012	EC	(Netherlands) Emmen	tournament (Swiss system)	+2 =7 −0	8
2013	WC	(Estonia) Tallinn	match with (Russia) Alexander Schwarzman		1
2013	WC	(Russia) Ufa	tournament	+4 =7 −0 **	1
2014	EC	(Estonia) Tallinn	tournament (Swiss system)	+2 =7 −0	11
2015	WC	(Turkey) İzmir	match with (Cameroon) Jean Marc Ndjofang		1 ****
2015	WC	(Netherlands) Emmen	tournament	+6 =13 −0	1
2017	WC	(Estonia) Tallinn	tournament	+1 =9 −1 **	7
2019	WC	(Ivory Coast) Yamoussoukro	tournament	+9 =10 −0	1

* Tied for 1st-3rd places, won blitz tournament.

** In final.

*** The main part of the match ended in a draw. The winner was determined in additional matches.

**** Equality in the classical format, the advantage in the Rapid format.
