= N'Diaga Samb =

Senegalese draughts grandmaster (1966–2025)

Personal information
- Born: August 6, 1966
- Died: February 19, 2025 (aged 58)

Sport
- Country: Senegal
- Sport: Draughts
- Rank: Grandmaster (1998)

Achievements and titles
- Highest world ranking: No. 9 (January 2003)
- Personal best: 2393 (January 2003, rating)

N'Diaga Samb (August 6, 1966 – February 19, 2025) was a Senegalese draughts player based in the Netherlands. He took first place at the African Championship in 2016, second place at the African Championship in 1992, 2006, 2014, 2018 and finished third in 2003, 2009 and 2010. He won several international tournaments and was awarded the titles of International Master (MI) in 1992 and International Grandmaster (GMI) in 2000.

On February 19, 2025, Samb died while being present at the closing ceremony at a checkers tournament in the Senegalese capital Dakar.

== World Championship ==
- 1992 (14 place)
- 2003 (14 place)
- 2007 (10 place)
- 2013 (1 place in final B)
- 2015 (11 place)
- 2016 (Blitz) (2 place)
- 2019 (16 place)

== African Championship ==
- 1992 (2 place)
- 2003 (3 place)
- 2006 (2 place)
- 2009 (3 place)
- 2010 (3 place)
- 2014 (2 place)
- 2016 (1 place)
- 2018 (2 place)

== International tournaments ==
1 place:

- 1991: Brunssum Open
- 1992: Mello Koolman toernooi
- 1998: Nijmegen Open
- 1999: Brunssum Open
- 2000: Mello Koolman toernooi and Bijlmertoernooi
- 2001: Zeeland Open
- 2002: Zeeland Open
- 2003: Leeuwarden
- 2018: Brunssum Open
- 2019: Brunssum Open

== Senegal Championship ==
- 1990 (1 place)
- 1992 (1 place)
- 2008 (1 place)
