= Jean Marc Ndjofang =

Cameroonian draughts grandmaster (born 1976)

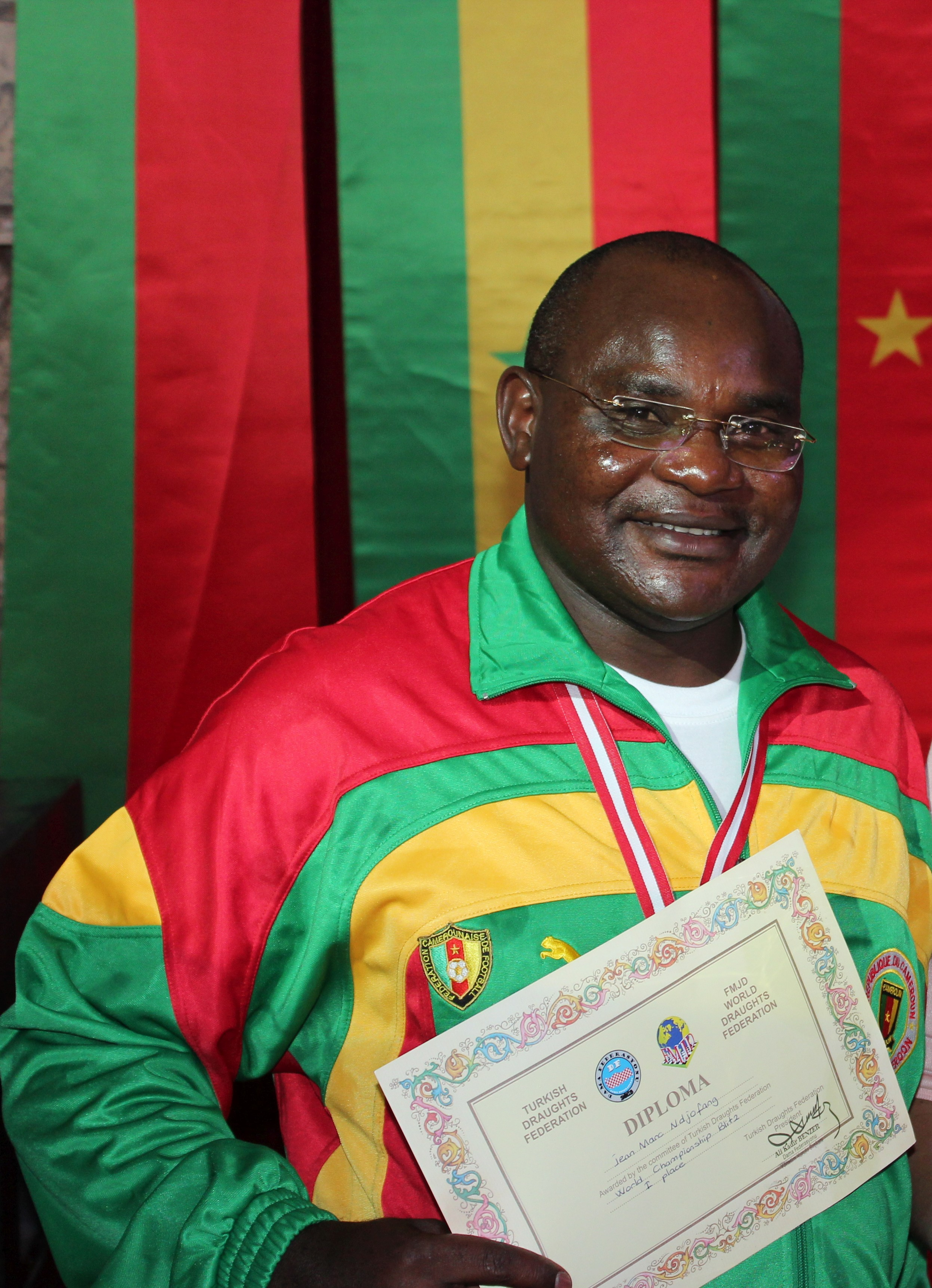
- Jean Marc Ndjofang (2017)

Personal information
- Born: March 15, 1976 (age 50) Ebolowa, Cameroon

Sport
- Country: Cameroon
- Sport: Draughts
- Rank: Grandmaster (2003)

Achievements and titles
- Highest world ranking: No. 11 (October 2006)
- Personal best: 2379 (October 2006, rating)

Jean Marc Ndjofang (born 15 March 1976 in Ebolowa) is a Cameroonian draughts player, resident since 2002 in the Netherlands. He was African champion in 2000 and 2010. In 2011 at the Draughts World Championship he took third place. In 2013 he placed second at the Draughts World Championship. In 2015 he played the World Draughts Championship match with Alexander Georgiev from Russia.

In 2017 Jean Marc Ndjofang became World Draughts Championship blitz.
