= Joel N'cho Atse =

Ivorian draughts grandmaster (born 1983)

Personal information
- Born: June 5, 1983 (age 43) Abidjan, Ivory Coast

Sport
- Country: Ivory Coast
- Sport: Draughts
- Rank: Grandmaster (2012)

Achievements and titles
- Highest world ranking: No. 10 (October 2019)
- Personal best: 2370 (July 2019, rating)

Joel N'cho Atse is an Ivorian draughts grandmaster. He has won the African Draughts Championship in 2012, 2018, and 2022.

== Career ==
In December 2013, he won the SportAccord World Mind Games, beating 10-time world champion Alexei Chizhov. This made him the first Ivorian draughts player to win a major title.

In October 2019, he finished in 8th place at the 2019 World Draughts Championship.

In July 2021, he reached the final stage and finished in 12th place at the 2021 World Draughts Championship.

In October 2023, he finished in 7th place at the 2023 World Draughts Championship.

In August 2024, he won the Ivorian Draughts Championship for the 8th time.

In July 2025, he won the Heritage Open draughts tournament, defeating 5-time world champion Alexander Schwarzman.
