= List of Draughts World Championship winners =

The Draughts World Championship in international draughts is the world championship, which began in 1885 in France; since 1948, it has been organised by the World Draughts Federation (FMJD). The championship has had winners from the Netherlands, Canada, the Soviet Union, Senegal, Latvia, Russia, and Ukraine.

The championship occurs every two years. Since 1984, a World Title match takes place on every second world championship.

The current champion is Jan Groenendijk.

Year	Winner	Nationality
1885*	Anatole Dussaut	France
1886*	Anatole Dussaut	France
1887*	Louis Barteling	France
1891*	Louis Barteling	France
1894*	Louis Barteling; Anatole Dussaut; Louis Raphaël	France
1895*	Eugène Leclercq	France
1895*	Isidore Weiss	France
1899	Isidore Weiss	France
1900	Isidore Weiss	France
1903	Isidore Weiss	France
1904 (match)	Isidore Weiss	France
1907 (match)	Isidore Weiss	France
1909	Isidore Weiss	France
1911 (match)	Isidore Weiss	France
1912 (match)	Alfred Molimard	France
1912 (match)	Alfred Molimard	France
1912	Herman Hoogland	Netherlands
1925	Stanislas Bizot	France
1926 (match)	Marius Fabre	France
1928	Benedictus Springer	Netherlands
1931	Marius Fabre	France
1933 (match)	Maurice Raichenbach	France
1934 (match)	Maurice Raichenbach	France
1936 (match)	Maurice Raichenbach	France
1936 (match)	Maurice Raichenbach	France
1937 (match)	Maurice Raichenbach	France
1938 (match)	Maurice Raichenbach	France
1945 (match)	Pierre Ghestem	France
1947 (match)	Pierre Ghestem	France
1948	Piet Roozenburg	Netherlands
1951 (match)	Piet Roozenburg	Netherlands
1952	Piet Roozenburg	Netherlands
1954 (match)	Piet Roozenburg	Netherlands
1956	Marcel Deslauriers	Canada
1958 (match)	Iser Kuperman	Soviet Union
1959 (match)	Iser Kuperman	Soviet Union
1960	Vyacheslav Shchyogolev	Soviet Union
1961 (match)	Iser Kuperman	Soviet Union
1963 (match)	Iser Kuperman; Baba Sy	Soviet Union; Senegal
1964	Vyacheslav Shchyogolev	Soviet Union
1965 (match)	Iser Kuperman	Soviet Union
1967 (match)	Iser Kuperman	Soviet Union
1968	Andris Andreiko	Soviet Union
1969 (match)	Andris Andreiko	Soviet Union
1972 (match)	Andris Andreiko	Soviet Union
1972	Ton Sijbrands	Netherlands
1973 (match)	Ton Sijbrands	Netherlands
1974 (match)	Iser Kuperman	Soviet Union
1976	Harm Wiersma	Netherlands
1978	Anatoli Gantvarg	Soviet Union
1979 (match)	Harm Wiersma	Netherlands
1980	Anatoli Gantvarg	Soviet Union
1981 (match)	Harm Wiersma	Netherlands
1982	Jannes van der Wal	Netherlands
1983	Harm Wiersma	Netherlands
1983 (match)	Harm Wiersma	Netherlands
1984 (match)	Harm Wiersma	Netherlands
1984	Anatoli Gantvarg	Soviet Union
1985 (match)	Anatoli Gantvarg	Soviet Union
1986	Alexander Dybman	Soviet Union
1987(match)	Alexander Dybman	Soviet Union
1988	Alexei Chizhov	Soviet Union
1989 (match)	Alexei Chizhov	Soviet Union
1990	Alexei Chizhov	Soviet Union
1991 (match)	Alexei Chizhov	Soviet Union
1992	Alexei Chizhov	Russia
1993 (match)	Alexei Chizhov	Russia
1994	Guntis Valneris	Latvia
1995 (match)	Alexei Chizhov	Russia
1996	Alexei Chizhov	Russia
1998 (match)	Alexander Schwartzman	Russia
2000	Alexei Chizhov	Russia
2003 (match)	Alexander Georgiev	Russia
2003	Alexander Georgiev	Russia
2004 (match)	Alexander Georgiev	Russia
2005	Alexei Chizhov	Russia
2006 (match)	Alexander Georgiev	Russia
2007	Alexander Schwartzman	Russia
2009 (match)	Alexander Schwartzman	Russia
2011	Alexander Georgiev	Russia
2013 (match)	Alexander Georgiev	Russia
2013	Alexander Georgiev	Russia
2015 (match)	Alexander Georgiev	Russia
2015	Alexander Georgiev	Russia
2016 (match)	Roel Boomstra	Netherlands
2017	Alexander Schwartzman	Russia
2018 (match)	Roel Boomstra	Netherlands
2019	Alexander Georgiev	Russia
2021	Alexander Schwartzman	Russia
2023	Yuri Anikeev	Ukraine
2024 (match)	Jan Groenendijk	Netherlands
2025	Jan Groenendijk	Netherlands

- The first seven mentioned championships (with a *) were international tournaments held in France, they are considered world championships because all leading players were presented in the tournaments.

== See also ==
- List of women's Draughts World Championship winners
- World Checkers/Draughts Championship
- List of Draughts-64 World Championship winners
