= European Draughts Championship =

The European Draughts Championship is the European championship in international draughts, organized since 1965 by the World Draughts Federation (FMJD) and the European Draughts Confederation. An annual blitz championship has been held since 2005, and an annual rapid championship since 2012. A team championship has been organized since 1967, with team blitz (since 2007) and team rapid (since 2013) competitions added later. A veterans championship (50+) was introduced in 2001. Youth championships are also held in the U27, U19, U16, U13, and U10 categories. Separate women's events are organized as well.

== Classical ==
Number	Year	Format	Location	Gold	Silver	Bronze
1	1965	Round-robin	(Italy) Bolzano	(Soviet Union) Iser Koeperman	(Soviet Union) Vyacheslav Shchyogolev	(Netherlands) Geert van Dijk
2	1967	Swiss system	(Italy) Livorno	(Netherlands) Ton Sijbrands	(Soviet Union) Vyacheslav Shchyogolev	(Soviet Union) Andris Andreiko
3	1968	Round-robin	(Italy) Livorno	(Netherlands) Ton Sijbrands	(Netherlands) Wim van der Sluis	(Netherlands) Ferdi Okrogelnik
4	1969	Swiss system	(Italy) Rome	(Netherlands) Ton Sijbrands	(Soviet Union) Andris Andreiko	(Netherlands) Andreas Kuyken
5	1971	Round-robin	(Soviet Union) Sukhumi	(Netherlands) Ton Sijbrands	(Soviet Union) Andris Andreiko	(Soviet Union) Anatoli Gantvarg
6	1974	Round-robin	(Italy) Arco	(Soviet Union) Andris Andreiko	(Soviet Union) Anatoli Gantvarg	(Netherlands) Frank Drost
7	1977	Round-robin	(Belgium) Brussels	(Soviet Union) Rostislav Leszczynski	(Netherlands) Jan de Ruiter	(Belgium) Oscar Verpoest
8	1983	Round-robin	(Netherlands) Deventer	(Soviet Union) Vadim Virny	(Soviet Union) Vyacheslav Shchyogolev	(Netherlands) Jos Stokkel
9	1987	Round-robin	(Soviet Union) Moscow	(Netherlands) Gerard Jansen	(Soviet Union) Vadim Virny	(Netherlands) Rob Clerc / (Netherlands) Hendrik van der Zee
10	1992	Round-robin	(France) Parthenay	(Latvia) Guntis Valneris	(Netherlands) Rob Clerc	(Netherlands) Gerard Jansen
11	1995	Round-robin	(Poland) Lubliniec	(Russia) Alexander Georgiev	(Latvia) Guntis Valneris	(Russia) Andrei Kalmakov
12	1999	Round-robin	(Netherlands) Hoogezand	(Netherlands) Harm Wiersma	(Netherlands) Ton Sijbrands	(Latvia) Guntis Valneris
13	2002	Play-off	(Netherlands) Domburg	(Russia) Alexander Schwarzman	(Russia) Alexander Georgiev	(Netherlands) Gerard Jansen
14	2006	Swiss system	(Slovenia) Bovec	(Russia) Alexander Georgiev	(Russia) Alexander Schwarzman	(Latvia) Guntis Valneris
15	2008	Swiss system	(Estonia) Tallinn	(Latvia) Guntis Valneris	(Russia) Alexander Georgiev	(Lithuania) Edward Buzhinskiy
16	2010	Swiss system	(Poland) Zakopane	(Russia) Alexander Georgiev	(Russia) Murodoullo Amrillaev	(Netherlands) Pim Meurs
17	2012	Swiss system	(Netherlands) Emmen	(Russia) Alexei Chizhov	(Latvia) Guntis Valneris	(Netherlands) Pim Meurs
18	2014	Swiss system	(Estonia) Tallinn	(Netherlands) Roel Boomstra	(Russia) Ainur Shaibakov	(France) Arnaud Cordier
19	2016	Swiss system	(Turkey) İzmir	(Russia) Alexei Chizhov	(Netherlands) Roel Boomstra	(Netherlands) Martijn van Ijzendoorn
20	2018	Swiss system	(Russia) Moscow	(Belarus) Michael Semyaniuk	(Russia) Alexander Georgiev	(Netherlands) Martijn van Ijzendoorn
21	2022	Swiss system	(Belgium) Kortrijk	(Netherlands) Jan Groenendijk	(Netherlands) Jitse Slump	(Netherlands) Roel Boomstra
22	2024	Swiss system	(Italy) Chianciano Terme	(Netherlands) Jan Groenendijk	(Netherlands) Jitse Slump	(Latvia) Guntis Valneris
23	2026	Swiss system	(Netherlands) Beilen	(Netherlands) Jitse Slump	(France) Kevin Machtelinck	(Netherlands) Erno Prosman

== Rapid ==
Number	Year	Format	Location	Gold	Silver	Bronze
1	2012	Swiss system	(Estonia) Tallinn	(Russia) Alexander Georgiev	(Russia) Alexander Schwarzman	(Russia) Andrei Kalmakov
2	2013	Round-robin	(Slovenia) Bovec	(Russia) Alexander Schwarzman	(Russia) Alexander Getmanski	(Russia) Murodoullo Amrillaev
3	2014	Swiss system	(Czech Republic) Prague	(Ukraine) Artem Ivanov	(Russia) Alexander Getmanski	(Russia) Alexander Schwarzman
4	2015	Swiss system	(Italy) Bacoli	(Russia) Alexander Schwarzman	(Latvia) Guntis Valneris	(Russia) Alexander Georgiev
5	2016	Swiss system	(Turkey) İzmir	(Russia) Alexander Schwarzman	(Netherlands) Roel Boomstra	(Netherlands) Martijn van IJzendoorn
6	2017	Swiss system	(Poland) Karpacz	(Netherlands) Roel Boomstra	(Russia) Alexander Getmanski	(Russia) Alexander Schwarzman
7	2018	Swiss system	(Israel) Netanya	(Ukraine) Artem Ivanov	(Latvia) Guntis Valneris	(Russia) Alexander Getmanski
8	2019	Swiss system	(Israel) Netanya	(Russia) Alexander Schwarzman	(Ukraine) Yuri Anikeev	(Ukraine) Igor Kirzner
9	2021	Swiss system	(Italy) Chianciano Terme	(Russia) Alexander Schwarzman	(Netherlands) Jitse Slump	(Ukraine) Yuri Anikeev
10	2022	Swiss system	(Netherlands) Hijken	(Netherlands) Wouter Sipma	(Ukraine) Artem Ivanov	(Latvia) Guntis Valneris
11	2023	Swiss system	(Netherlands) Beilen	(Netherlands) Jan Groenendijk	(Netherlands) Jos Stokkel	(Lithuania) Aleksej Domchev
12	2024	Swiss system	(Italy) Chianciano Terme	(Ukraine) Yuri Anikeev	(Israel) Alexander Schwarzman	(Netherlands) Jan Groenendijk
13	2025	Swiss system	(Belgium) Brussels	(Israel) Alexander Schwarzman	(Latvia) Guntis Valneris	(Netherlands) Jitse Slump
14	2026	Swiss system	(Netherlands) Beilen	(Israel) Alexander Schwarzman	(Netherlands) Martijn van Ijzendoorn	(Netherlands) Simon Harmsma

== Blitz ==
Number	Year	Format	Location	Gold	Silver	Bronze
1	2005	Swiss system	(Czech Republic) Prague	(Ukraine) Yuri Anikeev	(Russia) Alexander Getmanski	(Latvia) Roberts Misans
2	2007	Swiss system	(France) Cannes	(Russia) Alexei Chizhov	(Latvia) Guntis Valneris	(Netherlands) Alexander Baljakin (Russia) Alexander Georgiev
3	2008	Round-robin	(Bulgaria) Varna	(Latvia) Raimonds Vipulis	(Latvia) Guntis Valneris	(Ukraine) Yuri Anikeev
4	2009	Round-robin	(Sweden) Stockholm	(Netherlands) Alexander Baljakin	(Russia) Alexander Georgiev	(Russia) Murodoullo Amrillaev
5	2010	Round-robin	(Lithuania) Vilnius	(Russia) Alexander Schwarzman	(Latvia) Roberts Misans	(Russia) Murodoullo Amrillaev
6	2011	Round-robin	(Estonia) Tallinn	(Russia) Alexander Schwarzman	(Latvia) Roberts Misans	(Latvia) Raimonds Vipulis
7	2012	Round-robin	(Sweden) Stockholm	(Russia) Alexander Schwarzman	(Russia) Alexander Georgiev (Latvia) Guntis Valneris	-----
8	2013	Round-robin	(Hungary) Budapest	(Russia) Alexander Schwarzman	(Latvia) Raimonds Vipulis	(Russia) Alexander Getmanski
9	2014	Swiss system	(Estonia) Tallinn	(Russia) Murodoullo Amrillaev (Russia) Alexei Chizhov	-----	(Russia) Alexander Georgiev (Russia) Ivan Trofimov
10	2015	Swiss system	(France) Cannes	(Russia) Alexander Schwarzman	(Latvia) Guntis Valneris	(Russia) Aynur Shaibakov
11	2016	Swiss system	(Turkey) İzmir	(Russia) Aynur Shaibakov	(Russia) Alexei Chizhov	(Russia) Murodoullo Amrillaev
12	2017	Swiss system	(France) Cannes	(Russia) Alexander Schwarzman	(Latvia) Guntis Valneris	(Russia) Alexander Getmanski
13	2018	Swiss system	(Israel) Netanya	(Russia) Alexander Getmanski	(Russia) Ainur Shaibakov	(Latvia) Guntis Valneris
14	2019	Swiss system	(Israel) Netanya	(Russia) Aynur Shaibakov	(Russia) Murodoullo Amrillaev	(Ukraine) Yuri Anikeev
15	2021	Swiss system	(Italy) Chianciano Terme	(Ukraine) Yuri Anikeev	(Netherlands) Jan Groenendijk	(Ukraine) Artem Ivanov
16	2022	Swiss system	(Netherlands) Hijken	(Netherlands) Roel Boomstra	(Ukraine) Yuri Anikeev	(Latvia) Guntis Valneris
17	2023	Swiss system	(Netherlands) Beilen	(Netherlands) Jan Groenendijk	(Netherlands) Wouter Sipma	(Netherlands) Jos Stokkel
18	2024	Swiss system	(Italy) Chianciano Terme	(Israel) Alexander Schwarzman	(Netherlands) Jan Groenendijk	(Ukraine) Yuri Anikeev
19	2025	Swiss system	(Belgium) Brussels	(Latvia) Guntis Valneris	(Netherlands) Jitse Slump	(France) Kevin Machtelinck
20	2026	Swiss system	(Netherlands) Beilen	(Israel) Alexander Schwarzman	(Netherlands) Jan Groenendijk	(Netherlands) Jitse Slump

== Superblitz ==
Number	Year	Format	Location	Gold	Silver	Bronze
1	2016	Swiss system	(Turkey) İzmir	(Russia) Alexei Chizhov	(Ukraine) Yuri Anikeev	(Russia) Aynur Shaibakov
2	2018	Swiss system	(Russia) Moscow	(Russia) Aynur Shaibakov	(Russia) Alexander Georgiev	(Russia) Murodoullo Amrillaev

== See also ==
- European Women's Draughts Championship
