= USSR International Draughts Championship =

The USSR International Draughts Championship was the USSR championship in international draughts.

== History ==
The annual draughts competition was held in the USSR from 1954 to 1991. The first official championship was held in 1954 in Leningrad. It was preceded by the All-Union Training Tournament in 1953, in which 16 players participated, 12 of whom were Masters of Sport of the USSR. In some years, an additional match was held to determine the winner. Starting in 1986, a preliminary stage was introduced: 32 participants competed in a nine-round Swiss-system tournament to determine ten finalists, who then played for the championship title. The first league was also created. The last championship was held in 1991 in connection with the dissolution of the Soviet Union. Many Russian draughts players became world champion in international draughts.

== Results ==
Number	Year	Host	Gold	Silver	Bronze
1	1954	Leningrad	Iser Kuperman	Pyotr Sviatoy	Zinovi Tsirik
2	1955 + match	Minsk	Iser Kuperman	Maks Shavel	Zinovi Tsirik; Vladimir Kaplan
3	1956	Kyiv	Iser Kuperman	Maks Shavel	Anatoli Kovrizhkin
4	1958	Leningrad	Michail Korhov	Moisei Stanovski	Rudolf Suplin
5	1959 + match	Kyiv	Vyacheslav Shchyogolev	Michail Korchov	Maks Shavel
6	1960	Minsk	Michail Korhov	Zinovi Tsirik	Maks Shavel
7	1961	Jūrmala	Andris Andreiko	Iser Kuperman	Erlen Pomeranets
8	1962	Ufa	Iser Kuperman	Andris Andreiko	Valeriy Epifanov
9	1963 + match	Leningrad	Vyacheslav Shchyogolev	Andris Andreiko	Aleksander Rats
10	1964 + match	Odessa	Vyacheslav Shchyogolev	Andris Andreiko	Nikolay Sretenski
11	1965	Tashkent	Andris Andreiko	Boris Shkitkin; Sergey Manshin	
12	1966	Moscow	Andris Andreiko	Vladimir Kaplan	Vyacheslav Shchyogolev
13	1967	Minsk	Iser Kuperman	Vyacheslav Shchyogolev	Anatoli Gantvarg
14	1968 + match	Kyiv	Andris Andreiko	Anatoli Gantvarg	Vyacheslav Shchyogolev
15	1969	Kharkiv	Anatoli Gantvarg	Vyacheslav Shchyogolev	Vladimir Kaplan
16	1970	Tallinn	Andris Andreiko	Michail Korchov	Iser Kuperman
17	1971	Tashkent	Andris Andreiko	Anatoli Gantvarg	Iser Kuperman; Michail Korchov
18	1972	Riga	Andris Andreiko	Anatoli Gantvarg; Lev Slobodskoy	
19	1973	Vilnius	Anatoli Gantvarg	Alexander Mogilianski	Vyacheslav Shchyogolev
20	1974	Lvov	Vladimir Agafonov	Vyacheslav Shchyogolev	Nikolay Abatsiev
21	1975	Voroshilovgrad	Andris Andreiko	Anatoli Gantvarg	Alexander Mogilianski
22	1976	Odessa	Vyacheslav Shchyogolev	Rostislav Leshchinsky	Maks Shavel
23	1977	Yerevan	Anatoli Gantvarg	Nikolayj Mishchanski	Lev Slobodskoy
24	1978	Minsk	Michail Korenievski	Vyacheslav Shchyogolev	Anatoliy Chulkov
25	1979	Riga	Michail Korenievski; Alexander Mogilianski		Alexander Dybman
26	1980	Odessa	Nicolai Mistchanski	Alexander Dybman	Vyacheslav Shchyogolev
27	1981	Leningrad	Anatoli Gantvarg	Leonid Tsipes	Michail Korenevski
28	1982	Kyiv	Alexander Baljakin	Rostislav Leshchinsky	Vadim Virny
29	1983	Tallinn	Alexander Dybman	Vadim Virny	Vyacheslav Shchyogolev
30	1984	Arkhangelsk	Alexander Dybman	Anatoli Gantvarg	Alexander Baljakin
31	1985	Kharkiv	Nicolai Mistchanski	Vadim Virny	Rostislav Leshchinsky
32	1986	Minsk	Alexander Dybman	Alexander Baljakin	Nicolai Mistchanski
33	1987	Daugavpils	Michail Korenievski	Guntis Valneris	Alexander Mogilianski
34	1988	Yerevan	Alexander Baljakin	Alexei Chizhov	Guntis Valneris
35	1989	Tashkent	Alexander Baljakin	Vadim Virny	Alexander Schwarzman
36	1990	Leningrad	Alexei Chizhov	Yevgeni Vatutin	Guntis Valneris
37	1991	Oryol	Alexander Schwarzman	Igor Rybakov	Nicolai Mistchanski
