= Dutch Draughts Championship =

The Dutch Draughts Championship is the Dutch championship in international draughts.

== History ==
The first official championship took place in 1908. The championship has been held under the auspices of the Koninklijke Nederlandse Dambond (KNDB) since 1911.

== Results ==
| Year | Place | Winner |
|---|---|---|
| 1908 | Unknown | Jack de Haas |
| 1911 | Amsterdam | Jack de Haas |
| 1913 | Amsterdam | Herman Hoogland |
| 1916 | Amsterdam | Jack de Haas |
| 1919 | Amsterdam | Jack de Haas |
| 1920 | Amsterdam | L. Prijs |
| 1921 | Amsterdam | Arnold Damme |
| 1922 | Amsterdam | Johan Vos |
| 1923 | Amsterdam | Johan Vos |
| 1924 | Amsterdam | Herman de Jongh |
| 1925 | Unknown | Johan Vos |
| 1926 | Unknown | Reinier Cornelis Keller |
| 1927 | Amsterdam | Arnold Damme |
| 1929 | Amsterdam | Arnold Damme |
| 1930 | Amsterdam | Johan Vos |
| 1931 | Amsterdam | Wim Rustenburg |
| 1932 | Unknown | Johan Vos |
| 1933 | Amsterdam | Freek Raman |
| 1934 | Amsterdam | Reinier Cornelis Keller |
| 1935 | Amsterdam | Johan Vos |
| 1936 | Amsterdam | Reinier Cornelis Keller |
| 1937 | Amsterdam | Reinier Cornelis Keller |
| 1938 | Amsterdam | Reinier Cornelis Keller |
| 1939 | Rotterdam | Reinier Cornelis Keller |
| 1940 | Amsterdam | Reinier Cornelis Keller |
| 1941 | Different cities | Jan Bom |
| 1942 | Different cities | Reinier Cornelis Keller |
| 1943 | Unknown | Piet Roozenburg |
| 1944 | Unknown | Reinier Cornelis Keller |
| 1946 | Unknown | Reinier Cornelis Keller |
| 1948 | Unknown | Piet Roozenburg |
| 1949 | Unknown | Freek Gordijn |
| 1950 | Unknown | Piet Roozenburg |
| 1951 | Unknown | Reinier Cornelis Keller |
| 1952 | Unknown | Reinier Cornelis Keller |
| 1953 | Unknown | Wim Huisman |
| 1954 | Unknown | Piet Roozenburg |
| 1955 | Unknown | Reinier Cornelis Keller |
| 1956 | Unknown | Wim de Jong |
| 1957 | Unknown | Wim Roozenburg |
| 1958 | Unknown | Geert van Dijk |
| 1959 | Utrecht | Baris Dukel |
| 1960 | Unknown | Wim de Jong |
| 1961 | Unknown | Wim de Jong |
| 1962 | Unknown | Wim de Jong |
| 1963 | Unknown | Piet Roozenburg |
| 1964 | Amsterdam | Piet Roozenburg |
| 1965 | Utrecht | Piet Roozenburg |
| 1966 | Apeldoorn | Piet Roozenburg |
| 1967 | Apeldoorn | Ton Sijbrands |
| 1968 | Unknown | Pieter Bergsma |
| 1969 | Apeldoorn | Ton Sijbrands |
| 1970 | Apeldoorn | Ton Sijbrands |
| 1971 | Apeldoorn | Ton Sijbrands |
| 1972 | Unknown | Harm Wiersma |
| 1973 | Apeldoorn | Ton Sijbrands |
| 1974 | Unknown | Harm Wiersma |
| 1975 | Amsterdam | Harm Wiersma |
| 1976 | Unknown | Harm Wiersma |
| 1977 | Zevenaar | Harm Wiersma |
| 1978 | Zevenaar | Frank Drost |
| 1979 | Zevenaar/Soesterberg | Hans Jansen |
| 1980 | Bedum | Rob Clerc |
| 1981 | Assen | Jannes van der Wal |
| 1982 | Drenthe | Rob Clerc |
| 1983 | Schagen | Rob Clerc |
| 1984 | Huissen | Jannes van der Wal |
| 1985 | Abcoude | Jannes van der Wal |
| 1986 | Utrecht | Rob Clerc |
| 1987 | Nijverdal | Jannes van der Wal |
| 1988 | Putten | Ton Sijbrands |
| 1989 | Leeuwarden | Jos Stokkel |
| 1990 | Den Helder | Rob Clerc |
| 1991 | Drachten | Rob Clerc |
| 1992 | Surhuisterveen | Harm Wiersma |
| 1993 | Apeldoorn | Wieger Wesselink |
| 1994 | Huissen | Hans Jansen |
| 1995 | Stadskanaal | Auke Scholma |
| 1996 | Steenwijk | Erno Prosman |
| 1997 | Uithuizen | Hans Jansen |
| 1998 | Hoogezand | Harm Wiersma |
| 1999 | Huissen | Rob Clerc |
| 2000 | Hengelo | Rob Clerc |
| 2001 | Zwartsluis | Harm Wiersma |
| 2002 | Velp | Martin Dolfing |
| 2003 | Amsterdam | Kees Thijssen |
| 2004 | Huissen | Kees Thijssen |
| 2005 | Groningen | Kees Thijssen |
| 2006 | Culemborg | Kees Thijssen |
| 2007 | Soest | Kees Thijssen |
| 2008 | Emmeloord | Ron Heusdens |
| 2009 | Huissen | Alexander Baljakin |
| 2010 | Emmen | Alexander Baljakin |
| 2011 | Wapenveld | Alexander Baljakin |
| 2012 | Heerhugowaard | Roel Boomstra |
| 2013 | Steenwijk | Alexander Baljakin |
| 2014 | Steenwijk | Alexander Baljakin |
| 2015 | Emmeloord | Roel Boomstra |
| 2016 | Enschede | Alexander Baljakin |
| 2017 | Urk | Martijn van IJzendoorn |
| 2018 | Harlingen | Alexander Baljakin |
| 2019 | Huissen | Alexander Baljakin |
| 2020 | Kraggenburg | Jan Groenendijk |
| 2021 | Cancelled | |
| 2022 | Wageningen | Jan Groenendijk |
| 2023 | Drachten | Jan Groenendijk |
| 2024 | Drachten | Jan Groenendijk |
