= World Draughts Championship =

World championship in international draughts

The Draughts World Championship is the world championship in international draughts and is held every two years. In the even year following the tournament, the World Title match takes place. The championship began in 1885 in France and since 1948 has been organised by the World Draughts Federation (FMJD). The championship has had winners from the Netherlands, Canada, the Soviet Union, Senegal, Latvia, Russia and Ukraine.

The current champion is Jan Groenendijk.

Since 1998, there has been a Draughts World Championship held with a blitz time control (5 minutes plus an increment of 5 seconds per move). Since 2014 there has also been a Draughts World Championship held with a rapid time control (15 min + 5 sec per move).

== World title match ==
The championship is held every two years, in the odd years. The world title match takes place in the even year following the world championship tournament. The former champion and the new champion qualify for the world title match. If the former champion retains his title in the World Championship tournament, the runner-up earns the right to challenge him.

Unofficial champions (which are not listed here) were awarded retroactively; the first champion being Anatole Dussaut in 1885. A full list of winners can be found here.

== Classic ==
| Year | Host | Gold | Silver | Bronze | format |
|---|---|---|---|---|---|
| 1948 | Netherlands | (Netherlands) Piet Roozenburg | (Netherlands) Reinier Cornelis Keller | (France) Pierre Ghestem | tournament |
| 1951 | Netherlands | (Netherlands) Piet Roozenburg | | | match with Reinier Cornelis Keller (+2-1=15) |
| 1952 | Netherlands | (Netherlands) Piet Roozenburg | (Canada) Raoul Dagenais | (Netherlands) Reinier Cornelis Keller | tournament |
| 1954 | Netherlands | (Netherlands) Piet Roozenburg | | | match with Wim Huisman (+4=8-0) |
| 1956 | Netherlands | (Canada) Marcel Deslauriers | (Netherlands) Reinier Cornelis Keller | (Netherlands) Jan Bom (Netherlands) Piet Roozenburg | tournament |
| 1958 | Soviet Union | (Soviet Union) Iser Kuperman | | | match with Marcel Deslauriers (+4=14- 2) |
| 1959 | Soviet Union | (Soviet Union) Iser Kuperman | | | match with Geert van Dijk (+7=13-0) |
| 1960 | Netherlands | (Soviet Union) Vyacheslav Shchyogolev | (Senegal) Baba Sy | (Soviet Union) Iser Kuperman | tournament |
| 1961 | Soviet Union | (Soviet Union) Iser Kuperman | | | match with Vyacheslav Shchyogolev (+2=18-0) |
| 1963 | — | (Soviet Union) Iser Kuperman (Senegal) Baba Sy | | | match not played, title awarded in 1986 |
| 1964 | Italy | (Soviet Union) Vyacheslav Shchyogolev | (Soviet Union) Iser Kuperman | (Senegal) Baba Sy | tournament |
| 1965 | Soviet Union | (Soviet Union) Iser Kuperman | | | match with Vyacheslav Shchyogolev (+7=12-1) |
| 1967 | Soviet Union | (Soviet Union) Iser Kuperman | | | match with Andris Andreiko (+2=18-0) |
| 1968 | (Italy) Bolzano | (Soviet Union) Andris Andreiko | (Soviet Union) Iser Kuperman | (Soviet Union) Vyacheslav Shchyogolev | tournament |
| 1969 | Soviet Union | (Soviet Union) Andris Andreiko | | | match with Iser Kuperman (+3=17-0) |
| 1971 | Soviet Union | (Soviet Union) Andris Andreiko | | | match with Iser Kuperman (+0=20-0) |
| 1972 | Netherlands | (Netherlands) Ton Sijbrands | (Netherlands) Harm Wiersma | (Soviet Union) Andris Andreiko | tournament |
| 1973 | Netherlands | (Netherlands) Ton Sijbrands | | | match with Andris Andreiko (+2=18-0) |
| 1974 | | (Soviet Union) Iser Kuperman | | | match with Ton Sijbrands, not played |
| 1976 | Netherlands | (Netherlands) Harm Wiersma | (Soviet Union) Vyacheslav Shchyogolev | (Netherlands) Rob Clerc | tournament |
| 1978 | (Italy) Arco | (Soviet Union) Anatoli Gantvarg | (Netherlands) Harm Wiersma | (Soviet Union) Vyacheslav Shchyogolev | tournament plus match with Harm Wiersma (+1=5-0) |
| 1979 | Netherlands | (Netherlands) Harm Wiersma | | | match with Anatoli Gantvarg (+4=14-2) |
| 1980 | (Mali) Bamako | (Soviet Union) Anatoli Gantvarg | (Netherlands) Harm Wiersma | (Soviet Union) Nicolai Mistchanski | tournament |
| 1981 | Netherlands | (Netherlands) Harm Wiersma | | | match with Anatoli Gantvarg (+2=18-0) |
| 1982 | (Brazil) São Paulo | (Netherlands) Jannes van der Wal | (Netherlands) Rob Clerc | (Netherlands) Harm Wiersma | tournament (without sportsmen from Soviet Union, because of the military coup in Brazil, they have not received visas) |
| 1983 | Netherlands | (Netherlands) Harm Wiersma | (Soviet Union) Vadim Virny | (Netherlands) Rob Clerc | tournament (organized after protest Draughts Federation of the USSR) |
| 1983 | Netherlands | (Netherlands) Harm Wiersma | | | match with Jannes van der Wal (+1=19-0) (It is not recognized by Draughts Federation of the USSR) |
| 1984 | Netherlands; Soviet Union | (Netherlands) Harm Wiersma | | | match with Vadim Virny (+1=18-1) |
| 1984 | (Senegal) Dakar | (Soviet Union) Anatoli Gantvarg | (Netherlands) Rob Clerc | (Soviet Union) Michail Korenievski | tournament |
| 1985 | Netherlands | (Soviet Union) Anatoli Gantvarg | | | match with Rob Clerc (+2=17-1) |
| 1986 | Netherlands | (Soviet Union) Alexander Dybman | (Soviet Union) Alexander Baljakin | (Soviet Union) Michail Korenievski | tournament |
| 1987 | Soviet Union | (Soviet Union) Alexander Dybman | | | match with Anatoli Gantvarg (+0=20-0) |
| 1988 | (Suriname) Paramaribo | (Soviet Union) Alexei Chizhov | (Netherlands) Ton Sijbrands | (Soviet Union) Anatoli Gantvarg | tournament |
| 1989 | Netherlands | (Soviet Union) Alexei Chizhov | | | match with Ton Sijbrands (+1=18-1) |
| 1990 | Netherlands | (Soviet Union) Alexei Chizhov | (Soviet Union) Guntis Valneris | (Netherlands) Ton Sijbrands | tournament |
| 1991 | Estonia | (Soviet Union) Alexei Chizhov | | | match with Guntis Valneris (+6= 10-0) |
| 1992 | (France) Toulon | (Russia) Alexei Chizhov | (Netherlands) Harm Wiersma | (Belarus) Alexander Baljakin | tournament |
| 1993 | Russia; Estonia; Netherlands | (Russia) Alexei Chizhov | | | match with Harm Wiersma (+2=18-0) |
| 1994 | Netherlands | (Latvia) Guntis Valneris | (Netherlands) Harm Wiersma | (Belarus) Alexander Baljakin (Senegal) Macodou NDiaye | tournament |
| 1995 | Russia | (Russia) Alexei Chizhov | | | match with Guntis Valneris (+3 sets, −2 set) |
| 1996/97 | (Ivory Coast) Abidjan | (Russia) Alexei Chizhov | (Netherlands) Rob Clerc | (Russia) Alexander Schwartzman | tournament plus match with Rob Clerc (+1=10-0) |
| 1998 | Russia | (Russia) Alexander Schwartzman | | | match with Alexei Chizhov (+2 sets, −1 set) |
| 2001 | (Russia) Moscow | (Russia) Alexei Chizhov | (Latvia) Guntis Valneris | (Netherlands) Johan Krajenbrink | tournament |
| 2003 | Russia | (Russia) Alexander Georgiev | | | match with Alexei Chizhov (+4 sets, –1 set) |
| 2003 | Netherlands | (Russia) Alexander Georgiev | (Russia) Alexei Chizhov | (Latvia) Guntis Valneris | tournament |
| 2004 | Russia | (Russia) Alexander Georgiev | | | match with Alexei Chizhov (3-1 :15 games + tie-break)) |
| 2005 | Netherlands | (Russia) Alexei Chizhov | (Latvia) Guntis Valneris | (Netherlands) Alexander Baljakin | tournament |
| 2006 | | (Russia) Alexander Georgiev | | | match with Alexei Chizhov not played |
| 2007 | Netherlands | (Russia) Alexander Schwartzman | (Germany) Mark Podolski | (Russia) Alexander Georgiev | tournament |
| 2009 | Netherlands | (Russia) Alexander Schwartzman | | | match with Alexander Georgiev |
| 2011 | (Netherlands) Emmeloord / Urk | (Russia) Alexander Georgiev | (Russia) Murodoullo Amrillaev | (Cameroon) Jean Marc Ndjofang | tournament |
| 2013 | (Estonia) Tallinn | (Russia) Alexander Georgiev | | | match with Alexander Schwartzman |
| 2013 | (Russia) Ufa | (Russia) Alexander Georgiev | (Cameroon) Jean Marc Ndjofang | (Netherlands) Roel Boomstra | tournament |
| 2015 | (Turkey) İzmir | (Russia) Alexander Georgiev | | | match with Jean Marc Ndjofang |
| 2015 | (Netherlands) Emmen | (Russia) Alexander Georgiev | (Netherlands) Jan Groenendijk | (Netherlands) Roel Boomstra | tournament |
| 2016 | Netherlands | (Netherlands) Roel Boomstra | | | match with (Netherlands) Jan Groenendijk (+4=8-0) |
| 2017 | (Estonia) Tallinn | (Russia) Alexander Schwartzman | (Russia) Alexei Chizhov | (Latvia) Guntis Valneris | tournament |
| 2018 | Netherlands | (Netherlands) Roel Boomstra | | | match with (Russia) Alexander Schwartzman |
| 2019 | (Ivory Coast) Yamoussoukro | (Russia) Alexander Georgiev | (China) Pan Yiming | (Latvia) Guntis Valneris | tournament |
| 2021 | (Estonia) Tallinn | (Russia) Alexander Schwartzman | (Russia) Alexander Getmanski | (Netherlands) Roel Boomstra | tournament |
| 2022 | (Netherlands) Eindhoven | (Netherlands) Roel Boomstra | | | match with (Russia) Alexander Schwartzman |
| 2023 | (Curaçao) Willemstad | (Ukraine) Yuri Anikeev | (Netherlands) Jan Groenendijk | (Netherlands) Martijn van IJzendoorn | tournament |
| 2024 | (Netherlands) Wageningen | (Netherlands) Jan Groenendijk | | | match with (Ukraine) Yuri Anikeev |
| 2025 | (Cameroon) Yaoundé | (Netherlands) Jan Groenendijk | (Netherlands) Jitse Slump | (Latvia) Guntis Valneris | tournament |

== Rapid ==
| Year | Host | Gold | Silver | Bronze |
|---|---|---|---|---|
| 1999 | (Netherlands) Eindhoven | (Russia) Alexander Georgiev | (Russia) Alexander Shvartsman | (Netherlands) Alexander Baljakin |
| 2012 | (France) Lille | (Netherlands) Roel Boomstra | (Russia) Alexei Chizhov | (Russia) Ainur Shaibakov |
| 2014 | (Turkey) İzmir | (Russia) Ainur Shaibakov | (Russia) Murodoullo Amrillaev | (Russia) Alexander Schwartzman |
| 2015 | (Turkey) İzmir | (Netherlands) Alexander Baljakin | (Russia) Alexander Schwartzman | (Netherlands) Jasper Lemmen |
| 2016 | (Turkey) İzmir | (Ukraine) Yuri Anikeev | (Russia) Alexander Schwartzman | (Ukraine) Artem Ivanov |
| 2017 | (Turkey) İzmir | (Ukraine) Artem Ivanov | (Russia) Alexander Getmanski | (Russia) Alexander Georgiev |
| 2018 | (Italy) Bergamo | (Netherlands) Alexander Baljakin | (Russia) Alexander Schwartzman | (Russia) Alexei Chizhov |
| 2019 | (Netherlands) Beilen | (Netherlands) Roel Boomstra | (Russia) Alexander Georgiev | (Netherlands) Wouter Sipma |
| 2020 | (Turkey) Antalya | (Ukraine) Yuri Anikeev | (Russia) Nicolay Germogenov | (Russia) Sergey Belosheev |
| 2021 | (Poland) Julinek | (Russia) Alexander Getmanski | (Ukraine) Yuri Anikeev | (Russia) Alexander Schwartzman |
| 2022 | (Poland) Julinek | (Netherlands) Jitse Slump | (Netherlands) Jan Groenendijk | (Netherlands) Martijn van IJzendoorn |
| 2023 | (Poland) Julinek | (Netherlands) Jan Groenendijk | (Netherlands) Martijn van IJzendoorn | (Ukraine) Artem Ivanov |
| 2025 | (China) Lishui | (Netherlands) Jitse Slump | (Israel) Alexander Schwartzman | (Latvia) Guntis Valneris |
| 2026 | (China) Lishui | (Republic of the Congo) Cesar Mouanda | (Netherlands) Jitse Slump | (Israel) Alexander Schwartzman |

== Blitz ==
| Year | Host | Gold | Silver | Bronze |
|---|---|---|---|---|
| 1998 | (Netherlands) The Hague | (Russia) Alexander Schwartzman | (Netherlands) Erno Prosman | (Germany) Vadim Virny (Israel) Vladimir Traitelovich |
| 1999 | (United Kingdom) London | (Latvia) Guntis Valneris | (Netherlands) Erno Prosman | (Russia) Alexander Georgiev |
| 2000 | (Israel) Tel Aviv | (Russia) Alexander Schwartzman | (Latvia) Guntis Valneris | (Ukraine) Igor Kirzner |
| 2007 | (Israel) Nazareth | (Latvia) Guntis Valneris | (Russia) Alexander Schwartzman | (Israel) Ygal Koyfman |
| 2009 | (Germany) Berlin | (Russia) Alexander Schwartzman | (Latvia) Guntis Valneris | (Russia) Alexander Georgiev |
| 2011 | (Russia) Ufa | (Russia) Alexander Schwartzman | (Russia) Alexander Georgiev | (Russia) Gavril Kolesov |
| 2012 | (France) Lille | (Russia) Alexander Schwartzman | (Russia) Alexander Getmanski | (Netherlands) Roel Boomstra |
| 2013 | (Netherlands) Den Helder | (Russia) Alexander Schwartzman | (Russia) Alexander Georgiev | (Latvia) Guntis Valneris |
| 2014 | (Netherlands) Hilversum | (Russia) Alexander Georgiev | (Netherlands) Alexander Baljakin | (Russia) Alexander Schwartzman |
| 2015 | (Turkey) İzmir | (Russia) Alexander Schwartzman | (Cameroon) Jean Marc Ndjofang | (Ukraine) Yuri Anikeev |
| 2016 | (Turkey) İzmir | (Russia) Murodoullo Amrillaev | (Senegal) N'Diaga Samb | (Russia) Alexander Getmanski |
| 2017 | (Turkey) İzmir | (Cameroon) Jean Marc Ndjofang | (Ukraine) Yuri Anikeev | (Russia) Alexei Chizhov |
| 2018 | (Italy) Bergamo | (Russia) Alexander Schwartzman | (Russia) Alexei Chizhov | (Russia) Alexander Georgiev |
| 2019 | (Latvia) Riga | (Russia) Alexander Schwartzman | (Netherlands) Jan Groenendijk | (Russia) Ainur Shaibakov |
| 2020 | (Turkey) Antalya | (Russia) Ainur Shaibakov | (Russia) Alexander Georgiev | (Ukraine) Yuri Anikeev |
| 2021 | (Poland) Julinek | (Russia) Alexander Schwartzman | (Netherlands) Martijn van IJzendoorn | (Ukraine) Artem Ivanov |
| 2022 | (Latvia) Riga | (Lithuania) Aleksej Domchev | (Netherlands) Martijn van IJzendoorn | (Ukraine) Artem Ivanov |
| 2023 | (Israel) Nof HaGalil | (Ukraine) Artem Ivanov | (Israel) Alexander Schwartzman | (Lithuania) Aleksej Domchev |
| 2024 | (China) Lishui | (Israel) Alexander Schwartzman | (Ukraine) Yuri Anikeev | (Netherlands) Martijn van IJzendoorn |
| 2025 | (Latvia) Riga | (Latvia) Guntis Valneris | (Israel) Alexander Schwartzman | (Ukraine) Yuri Anikeev |
| 2026 | (Latvia) Riga | (Latvia) Guntis Valneris | (Netherlands) Jan Groenendijk | (Netherlands) Matheo Boxum |

== See also ==
- List of Draughts World Championship winners
- List of women's Draughts World Championship winners
- Women's World Draughts Championship
