= Alexander Dybman =

Soviet draughts player

Personal information
- Nationality: Germany
- Born: Александр Борисович Дыбман; 1962 (age 63–64) Leningrad, USSR

Sport
- Sport: International draughts
- Team: Soviet Union

Achievements and titles
- National finals: USSR national championships: champion (1983—86)
Medal record
Representing Soviet Union
International draughts
World Championships
Gold medal – first place	Groningen 1986	International draughts
Gold medal – first place	Irkutsk 1987	International draughts

Alexander Borisovich Dybman (Russian: Александр Борисович Дыбман; born in 1962) is an inactive Soviet International draughts player, two-time World champion (in 1986 and 1987), and four-time Soviet champion in International draughts.

At the age of 17, in 1979, Dybman won a bronze medal at the Soviet championship, and in 1980 he shared a second place at the Soviet championship with the former World champion, Vyacheslav Shchyogolev. In 1980 and 1981, Dybman won silver medals at the World junior championships–first in a tournament (with Alexander Baljakin taking the first place), and then after losing in the final barrage to another young Soviet player, Vadim Virny.

The best period in Dybman's playing career started in 1983, where he won four Soviet championships in a row. (In 1985, he took part in the Fall championships and skipped the ones in the Spring). The following year he won the World championship in Groningen and was awarded a Grandmaster title. The next year, he played a World championship match against Anatoli Gantvarg, drawing all 20 games which meant that he retained the World crown for one more year.

In the late 1980s, Alexander Dybman fell seriously ill. The Soviet medicine was not able to help him, and he moved to Germany. Since then, he almost never plays in official tournaments.
