= Elena Altsjoel =

Belarusian draughts player (born 1964)

- Алена Барысаўна Альтшуль
- Born: April 4, 1964 (age 61); Minsk, Belarusian SSR
- Known for: Women's World Draughts Champion in 1980, 1982, 1983, 1984, 1985.
- Spouse: Vadim Virny

Elena Altsjoel (also Altshul, Altchul or Altchoul; Belarusian: Алена Барысаўна Альтшуль, born 4 April 1964 in Minsk, Belarusian SSR) was the Women's World Draughts Champion in 1980 and from 1982 to 1985. She won her championship as a Soviet player, but today resides in Germany with her husband Vadim Virny.
