= Guntis Valneris =

Latvian draughts grandmaster (born 1967)

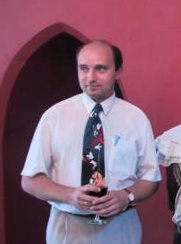
- Guntis Valneris (2002).

Personal information
- Nationality: Latvian
- Born: September 6, 1967 (age 58) Riga, Latvian SSR

Sport
- Country: Latvia
- Sport: International draughts
- Rank: Grandmaster (1986)
- Club: DV VBI Huissen, Netherlands

Achievements and titles
- World finals: 1994 World Championships: Gold
- Regional finals: 1992 European Championships: Gold; 2008 European Championships: Gold
- Highest world ranking: No. 1 (July 1995)
- Personal best: 2471 (January 1996, rating)

Guntis Valneris (born September 6, 1967 in Riga) is a Latvian draughts player. He was the 1994 World champion in international draughts, a two-time European champion (1992, 2008), two-time World champion in fast draughts (1999, 2007), three-time Junior World champion (1984–1986), and multiple-time Latvian national champion.

== Career highlights ==
Guntis Valneris started playing draughts when he was 10 years old. Viktor Adamovich became his first coach. In a year, Guntis won the Latvian U18 championship in Russian checkers, and at the age of 13 he was already the winner of the Latvian senior championships and the U18 USSR Champion. Another future World champion, Alexander Schwarzman, was one of the players he defeated at the Soviet U18 championships.

In 1982 Guntis Valneris switched to international draughts, with Emmanuils Merins becoming his new coach. Under Merins's guidance, Valneris three times in a row won the World Junior Championships. In 1985 he won his first senior Latvian championships in international draughts, and two years later he shared the first place at the senior USSR championships, losing gold medal in an ensuing barrage.

1987 was Valneris's debuting year in the European senior championships, and the next year he for the first time played in the senior World championships. Both times he finished with a good overall balance but not on a podium. Then in 1990 he tied for the second place at the World championships with the Dutch master Ton Sijbrands; a re-match for the silver medals was supposed to take place, but Sijbrands forfeited, and Valneris automatically proceeded to the championship match against the defending world champion Alexei Chizhov next year. The match that took place in Tallinn ended with Chizhov's unqualified victory.

This defeat did not stop Guntis. He won the European championships in Parthenay in 1992 and then the World championships in the Hague in 1994. The next year, in a return match, Chizhov took the world title back from him. In fact, the match was tied after the initial four sets, and then Chizhov managed to win a tie-breaking barrage set.

After that, Valneris multiple times won medals at the World and European championships, including the gold medal at the 2008 European championship. At the 2003 World championship he shared the first place in a three-way tie with Chizhov and Alexander Georgiev but lost to Georgiev in a marathon tie-break barrage and finished third overall. In 1999 and 2007 he also won the World championships in fast draughts (blitz), and in 2005 he won a medal at the World team championships where he took part as the leader of the Latvian national team.

Guntis Valneris currently remains one of the world international draughts leaders.

== Participation in World and European Championships ==
Year	Level	City	Tournament/Match	Result	Place
1987	EC	(Soviet Union) Moscow	Tournament	+6 =5 −2	6
1988	WC	(Suriname) Paramaribo	Tournament	+7 =11 −1	4-5
1990	WC	(Netherlands) Groningen	Tournament	+8 =11 −0	2-3
1991	WC	(Soviet Union) Tallinn	Match against (Soviet Union) A. Chizhov	+0 =10 −6	2
1992	EC	(France) Parthenay	Tournament	+10 =9 −0	1
1992	WC	(France) Toulon	Tournament	+9 =11 −3	7-8
1994	WC	(Netherlands) The Hague	Tournament	+8 =11 −0	1
1995	WC	(Russia) Yakutsk	Match against (Russia) A. Chizhov	+2 −3 in sets	2
1995	EC	(Poland) Lubliniec	Tournament	+11 =8 −0	2
1996	WC	(Ivory Coast) Abidjan	Tournament	+3 =7 −1	4-5
1999	EC	(Netherlands) Hoogezand	Tournament	+7 =8 −0	3
2000	WC	(Russia) Moscow	Tournament	+5 =11 −0	2
2002	EC	(Netherlands) Domburg	Tournament (play-off)		4
2003	WC	(Netherlands) Zwartsluis	Tournament	+7 =11 −1	3
2005	WC	(Netherlands) Amsterdam	Tournament	+3 =8 −0	2
2006	EC	(Slovenia) Bovec	Tournament (Swiss)	+4 =6 −0	3
2007	WC	(Netherlands) Hardenberg	Tournament	+2 =15 −2	13
2008	EC	(Estonia) Tallinn	Tournament (Swiss)	+4 =5 −0	1
2011	WC	(Netherlands) Emmeloord / Urk	Tournament	+3 =16 −0	5
2012	EC	(Netherlands) Emmen	Tournament (Swiss)	+3 =6 −0	2
2016	EC	(Turkey) İzmir	Tournament (Swiss)	+1 =8 −0	9
2017	WC	(Estonia) Tallinn	Tournament	+2 =9 −0	3
2018	EC	(Russia) Moscow	Tournament (Swiss)	+1 =8 −0	14
2019	WC	(Ivory Coast) Yamoussoukro	Tournament	+8 =11 −0	3
2021	WC	(Estonia) Tallinn	Tournament	+1 =8 −0	5 in semifinal В
2022	EC	(Belgium) Kortrijk	Tournament (Swiss)	+2 =7 -0	5-7
2023	WC	(Curaçao) Willemstad	Tournament	+3 =15 -0	10
2024	EC	(Italy) Chianciano Terme	Tournament (Swiss)	2+ 7= 0-	3
