= Maurice Raichenbach =

Polish-born French draughts player

Maurice Raichenbach speaks (DWC, 1935-1936)

Maurice Raichenbach (born near Warsaw, Poland on May 12, 1915; died in Hauts-de-Seine, France on March 1, 1998) was a Polish-born French draughts champion. His early childhood was spent in the area around Warsaw, but when he was a boy his mother died and his father moved them to France.

He started at age 10 and at 14 was the champion of "Seine draughts club." At eighteen he became Draughts World Championship, which made him the youngest world champion at International draughts up to that point in history and one of the youngest ever. Hence he was sometimes referred to as "The Mozart of the Checkerboard." He retained the title until 1938. During World War II he served the French army as a naturalized citizen. After France's defeat he went to the South of France and became a smuggler. His being Jewish was not known at this time and may have spared him a worse fate from the Nazis.

After the war he retired from professional draughts at age thirty, although he still played "friendly" games for years afterward. His more lasting, if less notable, career was in the clothing business and at one time he had 200 employees. He died in 1998.

== Bibliography ==
- Westerveld, Govert (2013). Biografía de Maurice Raichenbach, Campeón Mundial de las Damas entre 1933-1938. Tomo I. (300 pages)
- Westerveld, Govert (2013). Biografía de Maurice Raichenbach, Campeón Mundial de las Damas entre 1933-1938. Tomo II. (357 pages)
