= Vadim Virny =

German draughts grandmaster (born 1965)

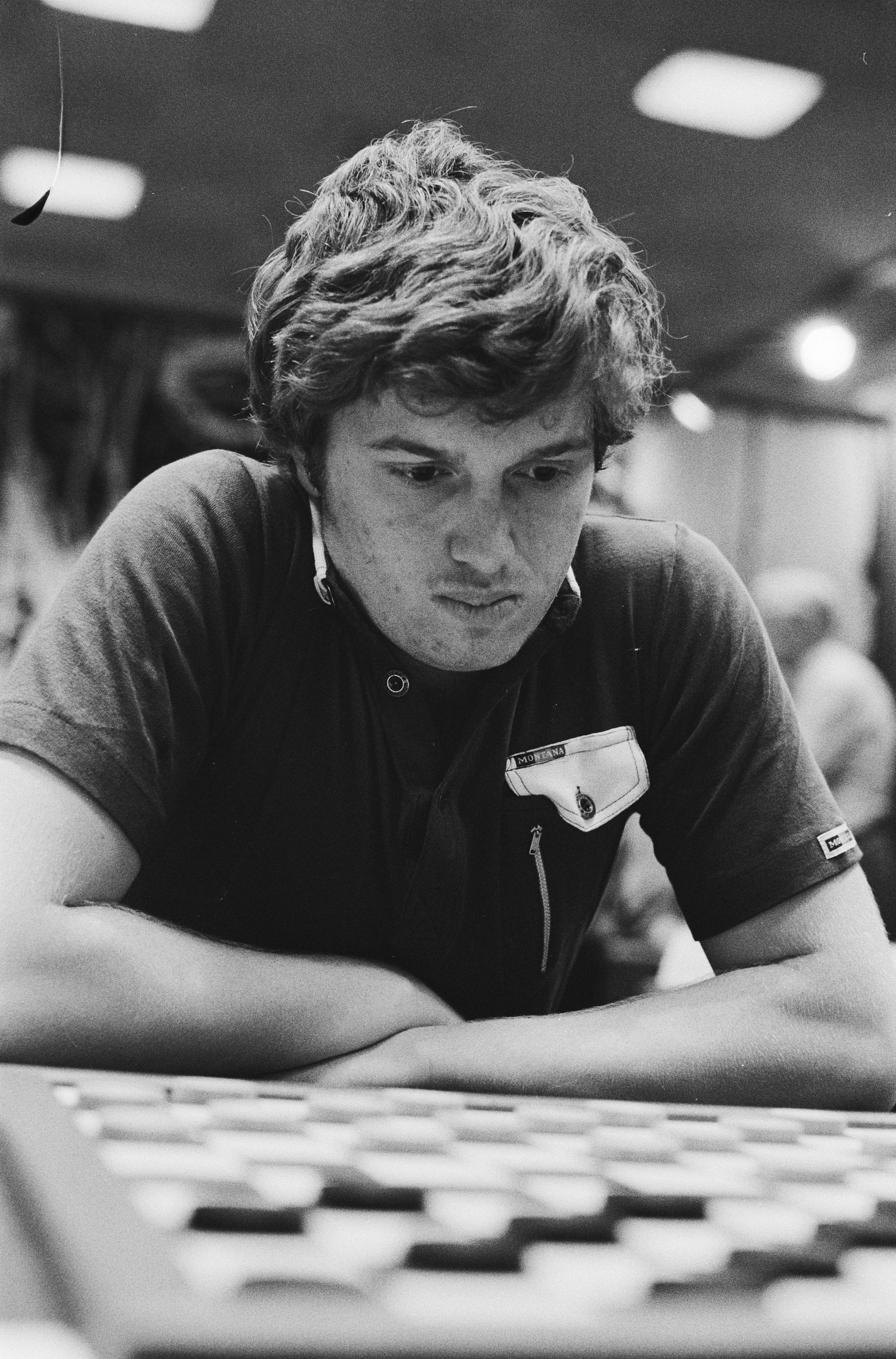
- Vadim Virny (1983)

Personal information
- Full name: Вадим Александрович Вирный
- Nationality: Germany
- Born: 1965 (age 60–61) Kharkiv, Ukrainian SSR

Sport
- Sport: International draughts
- Club: Orfam Telecom Twente
- Team: Soviet Union/Germany

Achievements and titles
- National finals: German national championships: champion (2008—2010)
Medal record
Representing Soviet Union
International draughts
World Championships
Silver medal – second place	Moscow-Rotterdam 1984	International draughts
European championships
Gold medal – first place	Deventer 1993	International draughts
World team championships
Gold medal – first place	Valkenburg 1986	International draughts
Gold medal – first place	Verona 1989	International draughts

Vadim Aleksandrovich Virny (Russian: Вадим Александрович Вирный, born 1965 in Kharkiv, Ukrainian SSR) is a German (formerly Soviet) International draughts player, an International Grandmaster. He was a European champion, World vice-champion and two-times World team champion in International draughts in the 1980s.

Vadim Virny's father is Alexander Yakovlevich Virny, well known as a draughts coach and an author of several draughts textbooks.

== Early achievements ==
Vadim became a draughts master when he was 13 years old. In 1979, at 14, he won a bronze medal at the World junior championship and the next year for the first time took part in the Soviet championship finals, sharing places 6—10. In 1981 he won the World junior championship in Brussels, defeating another young Soviet player, Alexander Dybman, in the final barrage. In 1983, at the age of 18, he became a European champion in Deventer (Netherlands) and was awarded a Grandmaster title. A month before that he took a second place, losing only to the reigning World champion Harm Wiersma, at a prestigious VOLMAC-Trophy tournament that was later recognized by the World Draughts Federation as a World championship. As a silver medalist he had the right to play a World championship match against the reigning champion next year.

In 1984 Virny met Wiersma in a World championship match and drew it (1+ 18= 1-), a result that allowed Wiersma to retain his crown. During this year he also played in a World championship tournament in Senegal but only shared places 4-5.

In 1985 the Soviet team including Virny won a World Zonal Cup, an unofficial World championship. In 1986 the Soviet Grandmasters won Draughts Olympiade, which is currently counted by the World Draughts Federation as a World team championship. Another team title was won by Virny as a member of the Soviet team at 1989 World team championship in Verona. In between, Virny also won a silver medal at the individual 1987 European championship.

In addition to his international titles, Vadim Virny was three-times (in 1983, 1985 and 1989) silver medalist of the Soviet championships in International draughts and a bronze medalist in 1982.

== Since the 1990s ==
In 1992 Vadim Virny moved to Germany with his wife, multiple World champion Elena Altchul, and started an IT career, paying less attention to sports. Only in the new millennium he started regularly playing again. In 2006 he won a silver medal at the Netherlands Open championship, the next year he became a silver medalist at the German national championship, and then in 2008—2010 won the national championships three times in a row He returned to the European championships in 2008 and 2010, taking, accordingly, 4th and 5th places.

== Personal record at the World and European championships ==
Year	Level	Venue	Tournament / Match	Result	Placed
1983	WC	(Netherlands) Amsterdam	Tournament	3+ 11= 0-	2
1983	EC	(Netherlands) Deventer	Tournament	8+ 3= 0-	1
1984	WC	(Soviet Union) Moscow / (Netherlands) Rotterdam	Match against (Netherlands) Harm Wiersma	1+ 18= 1-	2
1984	WC	(Senegal) Dakar	Tournament	3+ 16= 0-	4-5
1987	EC	(Soviet Union) Moscow	Tournament	9+ 4= 0-	2
2008	EC	(Estonia) Tallinn	Tournament (Swiss)	3+ 6= 0-	4
2010	EC	(Poland) Murzasichle	Tournament (Swiss)	3+ 6= 0-	5
2011	WC	(Netherlands) Emmeloord / Urk	Tournament	2+ 17= 0-	7-10
2012	EC	(Netherlands) Emmen	Tournament (Swiss)	3+ 5= 1-	15
2014	EC	(Estonia) Tallinn	Tournament (Swiss)	1+ 8= 0-	31
2017	WC	(Estonia) Tallinn	Tournament	0+ 9= 0- (in final)	11
