= Ben Springer =

Dutch draughts player (1897–1960)

Springer (right) plays Perot (1948)

Benedictus (Ben) Springer (Amsterdam, 19 June 1897 – Paris, 29 August 1960) was a Dutch draughts player with a national Grand master title. He became world champion in 1928. One of the standard combinations in draughts, the Coup Springer, is named after him.

== Dutch championships ==
Springer took part in the Dutch championships of draughts in 1919 and 1920. He finished in both tournaments with a positive score but came in 4th and 3rd respectively.

== World championship ==
Springer became world champion of draughts in 1928 in Amsterdam. He ended above Alfred Molimard. In 1931, he lost his title to Marius Fabre because Springer did not take part in the tournament for the world title that year.

== Literature ==
- B. Springer, Hoek ik Wereldkampioen werd 1929, The Hague
- B. Springer/A.L.B Loon, Oom Jan leert zijn neefje dammen 1956, Van Goor Zonen, The Hague
