= Stanislas Bizot =

French draughts player (1879–1950)

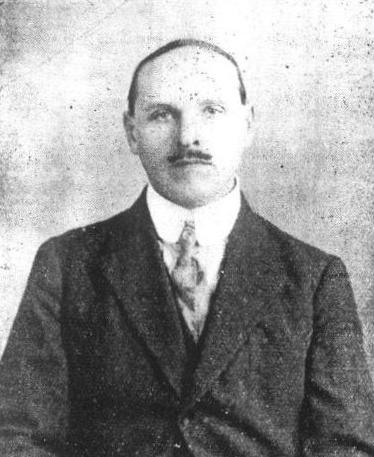
Stanislas Bizot

Stanislas Bizot (22 December 1879 in Nice – 2 June 1950) was a French draughts champion who debuted in 1901. He won the Draughts World Championship in 1925. In the following year he lost to Marius Fabre.
