= Baba Sy =

Senegalese draughts grandmaster (1935–1978)

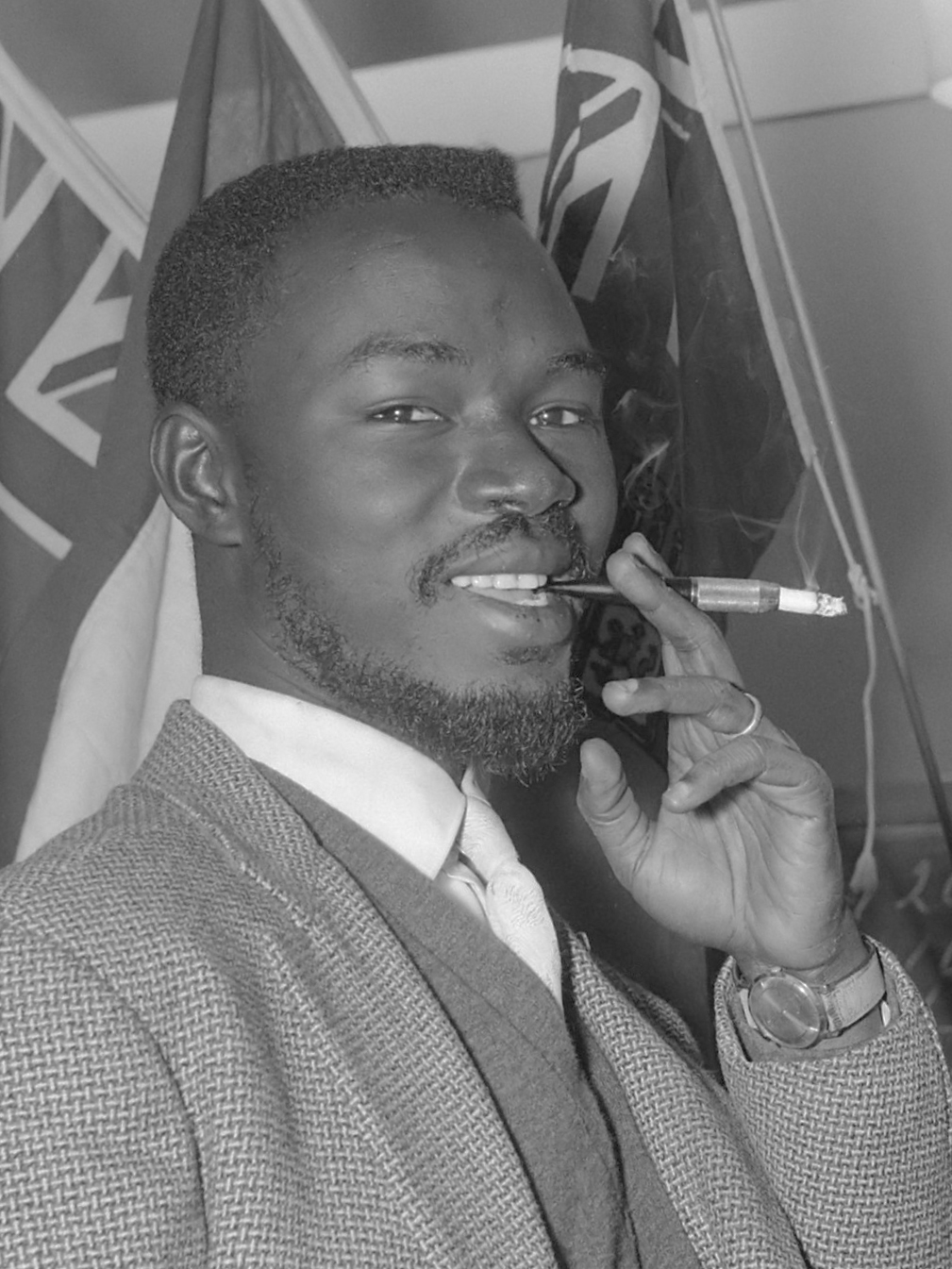
- Baba Sy in 1962

Personal information
- Born: 1935
- Died: August 20, 1978 (aged 42–43) Dakar, Senegal

Sport
- Country: Senegal
- Sport: Draughts
- Rank: Grandmaster (2005)

Baba Sy was a Senegalese international draughts player and the first world champion from Africa.

He was discovered in 1959 by Émile Biscons, a French draughts champion who was working in Dakar at the time.

In 1962 Germany organized a "big game/party", he was the only Senegalese and only African. He played against 150 players simultaneously spending few seconds per table. Several champions are part of the "big game/party" and he is declared the winner. By some accounts he is said to have beat each of the 150 players, in other accounts the results were 122 wins, 33 draws, and 5 losses. In either case, a remarkable achievement.

During the 1963–64 World Championship, a controversial dispute arose between him and Iser Kuperman, and the final match was not played. The championship title for this competition remained unresolved at the time of Baba Sy's death (car accident) in 1978. He was posthumously declared the joint victor in 1986. The matter caused some debate over the years.

He is sometimes seen as a pioneer who paved the way for other African players. He was posthumously awarded the Grandmaster title by FMJD in 2005.

== Publications ==
- Ton Sijbrands: Le grand livre de Baba Sy = Het groot Baba Sy boek. Voorst, 1989. ISBN 90-71811-03-4
- Govert Westerveld: Baba Sy, the World Champion of 1963-1964 of 10×10 Draughts - Volume I. Blanca, 2015. ISBN 978-1-326-39729-6
- Govert Westerveld: Baba Sy, the World Champion of 1963-1964 of 10×10 Draughts- Volume II. Blanca, 2015. ISBN 978-1-326-43862-3
