= Anatole Dussaut =

French draughts player

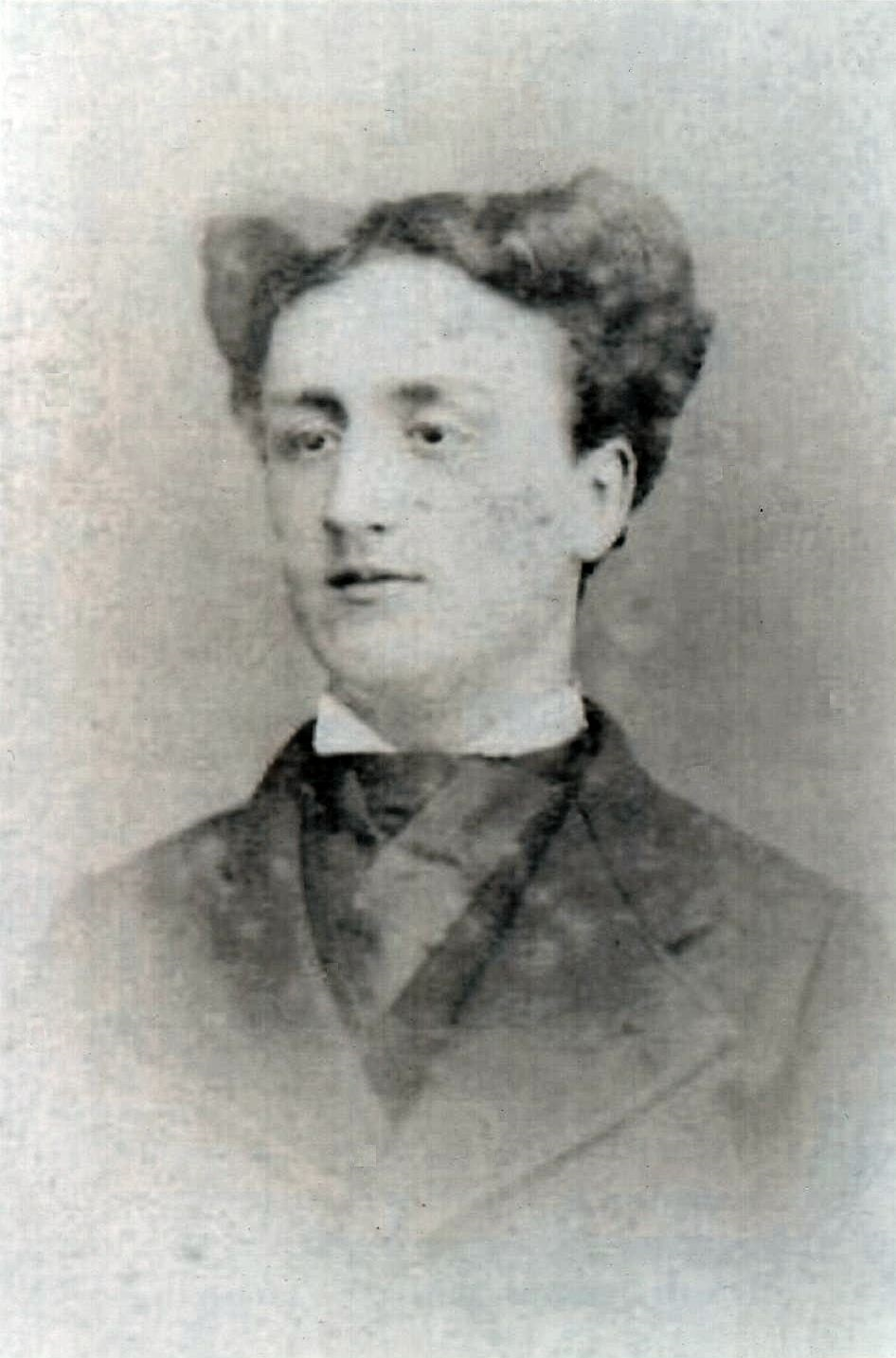
Anatole Dussaut

Anatole Dussaut (1857–1906) was a French draughts player and the first Draughts World Champion, winning it in 1885; he won the championship the first three years it was held. He is known for his Le Gambit Dussaut. In that period, the tournament took place solely in France but had international players, including all of the world's best.
