= Vladimir Kaplan =

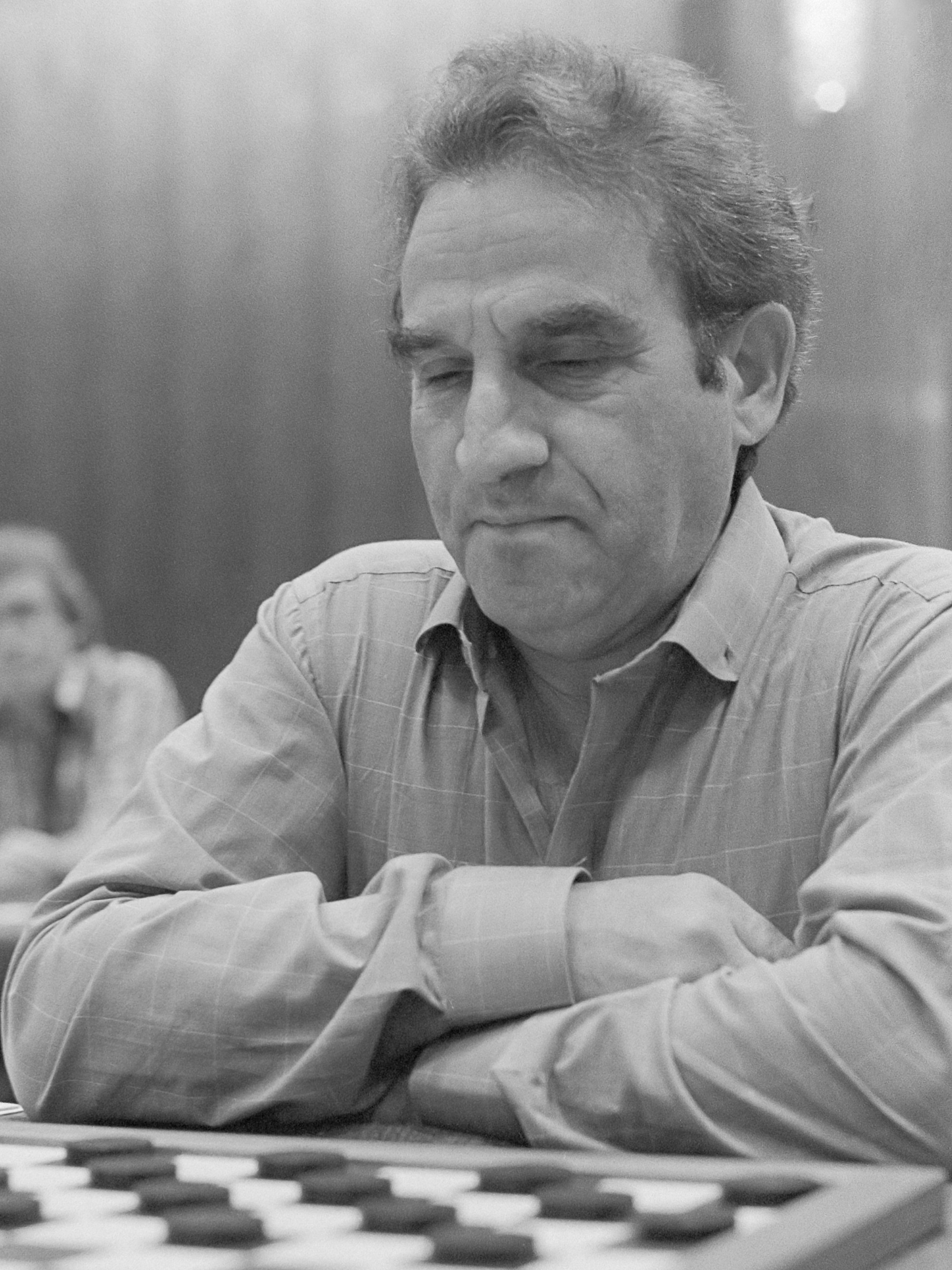
Wladimir Kaplan (1983)

Vladimir Kaplan (January 11, 1925 – September, 2000) was a noted player of pool checkers from Russia. Kaplan was an International Grandmaster who immigrated from Russia in 1977 to live in New York City, New York and by 1983 he played competitively for the United States.

His wife worked as an accountant on Wall Street to support his profession. He reportedly had some difficulties in international competitions because he was Jewish. Kaplan also wrote several books on the game.
