= Marcel Deslauriers =

Canadian draughts player (1905–1988)

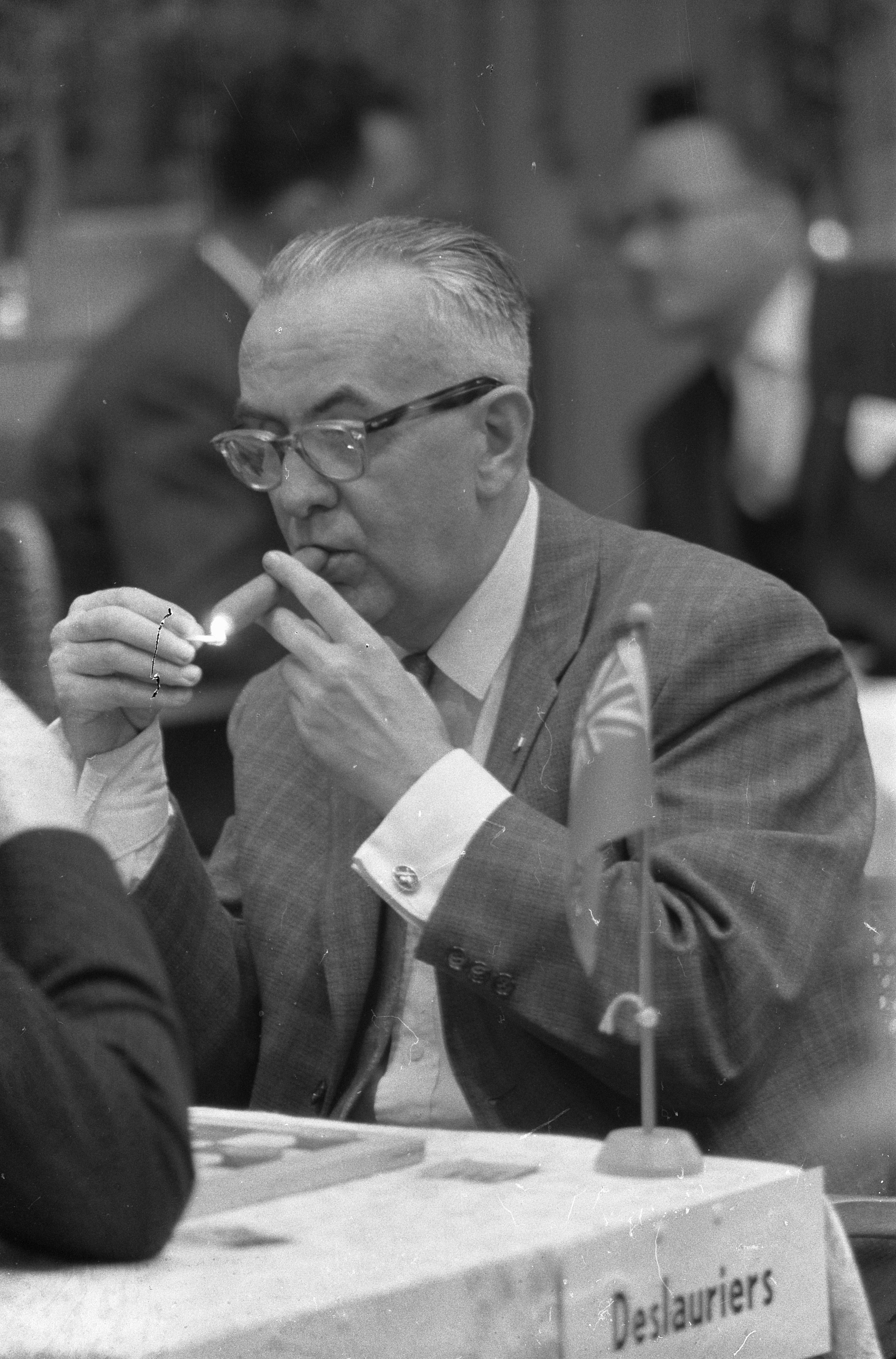
Marcel Deslauriers at the 1960 Draughts World Championship.

Marcel Deslauriers (Montreal on July 22, 1905 – December 1988) was a Canadian/Québécois international draughts player. In 1956 he became the only North American, male or female, to win Draughts World Championship. A tournament in Canada was named in his honor and a book was written on him and his strategies.

== Book on Deslauriers ==
- L.J.A Koops, Marcel Deslauriers : Partijen, fragmenten en analyses
