= Alfred Molimard =

Draughts grandmaster

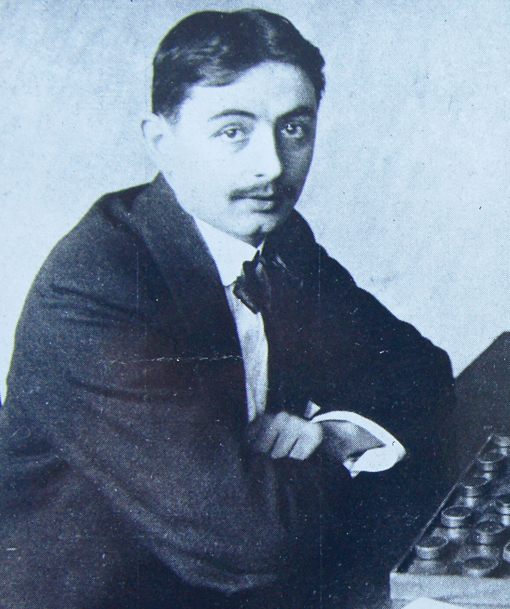
- Born: 29 October 1888; Serres

Alfred Molimard (October 29, 1888 in Serres, Hautes-Alpes – January 25, 1943) was a draughts grandmaster from France.

He joined a group devoted to the game in Lyon in 1907 and by 1909 was the champion of the town. He initially tended to lose against Isidore Weiss, but by 1912 he was the European champion in the game. In the same year he received his doctorate in medicine.

He became less active in the game in the 1920s and after 1928 was primarily a teacher. He died from a cerebral hemorrhage on January 25, 1943.
