= Yuri Anikeev =

Ukrainian draughts grandmaster (born 1983)

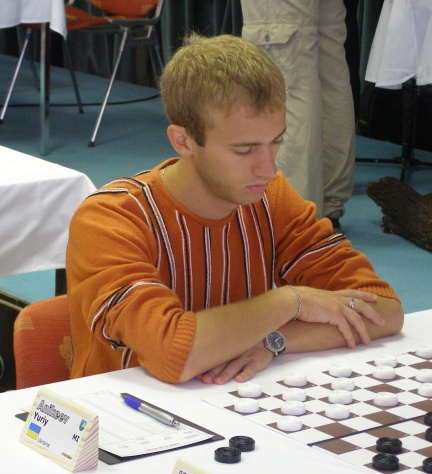

Personal information
- Born: June 11, 1983 (age 43) Kupiansk Ukrainian SSR USSR

Sport
- Country: Ukraine
- Sport: Draughts
- Rank: Grandmaster (2007)
- Club: Mo & Z (Volendam, Netherlands)

Achievements and titles
- Highest world ranking: No. 8 (October 2017)
- Personal best: 2384 (April 2018, rating)

Yuri Anikeev or Iurii Anikieiev (born June 11, 1983) is a Ukrainian International Grandmaster (GMI) of International and Brazilian draughts.

17th FMJD World Champion in draughts-100 and 11th World Champion in draughts-64 with classical time control.

== Career ==
He won the 2023 World Championship in International draughts, also won the 2004 World Championship in Brazilian draughts and won the 2016 Draughts World Championship (rapid). He has been the champion of Ukraine in International draughts and draughts-64 many times.

Anikeev was disqualified by the International Draughts Federation (IDF) from participation "in all official IDF competitions on the three years up to December 15, 2019." IDF cites breach of its code of ethics as the reason for the suspension. Anikeev claims that his political views as well as his wearing a Ukrainian embroidered shirt at international tournaments are the real reason for the suspension. As a resident of Kharkiv, Anikeev publicly voiced his criticism of Russia's annexation of Crimea and its invasions in Georgia and Eastern Ukraine. IDF is based in Saint Petersburg, with seven out of nine board members being Russian nationals (as of January 2017). In July, 2018 the Court of Arbitration for Sport quashed the disqualification.

== World Championship ==
=== International draughts ===
- 2007 (6 place)
- 2013 (4 place)
- 2017 (5 place)
- 2023 (1 place)

=== Brazilian draughts ===
- 2002 (3 place)
- 2004 (1 place)
- 2008 (2 place)
- 2018 (2 place)

=== Russian draughts ===
- 2020 (3 place)

== European Championship ==
=== International draughts ===
- 2006 (12 place)
- 2008 (26 place)
- 2012 (23 place)
- 2014 (19 place)
- 2016 (4 place)

=== Russian draughts ===
- 2019 (1 place)

== International tournaments ==
- 2006: Salou Open (2 place)
- 2008: Salou Open (3 place)
