= Julinek =

- Village
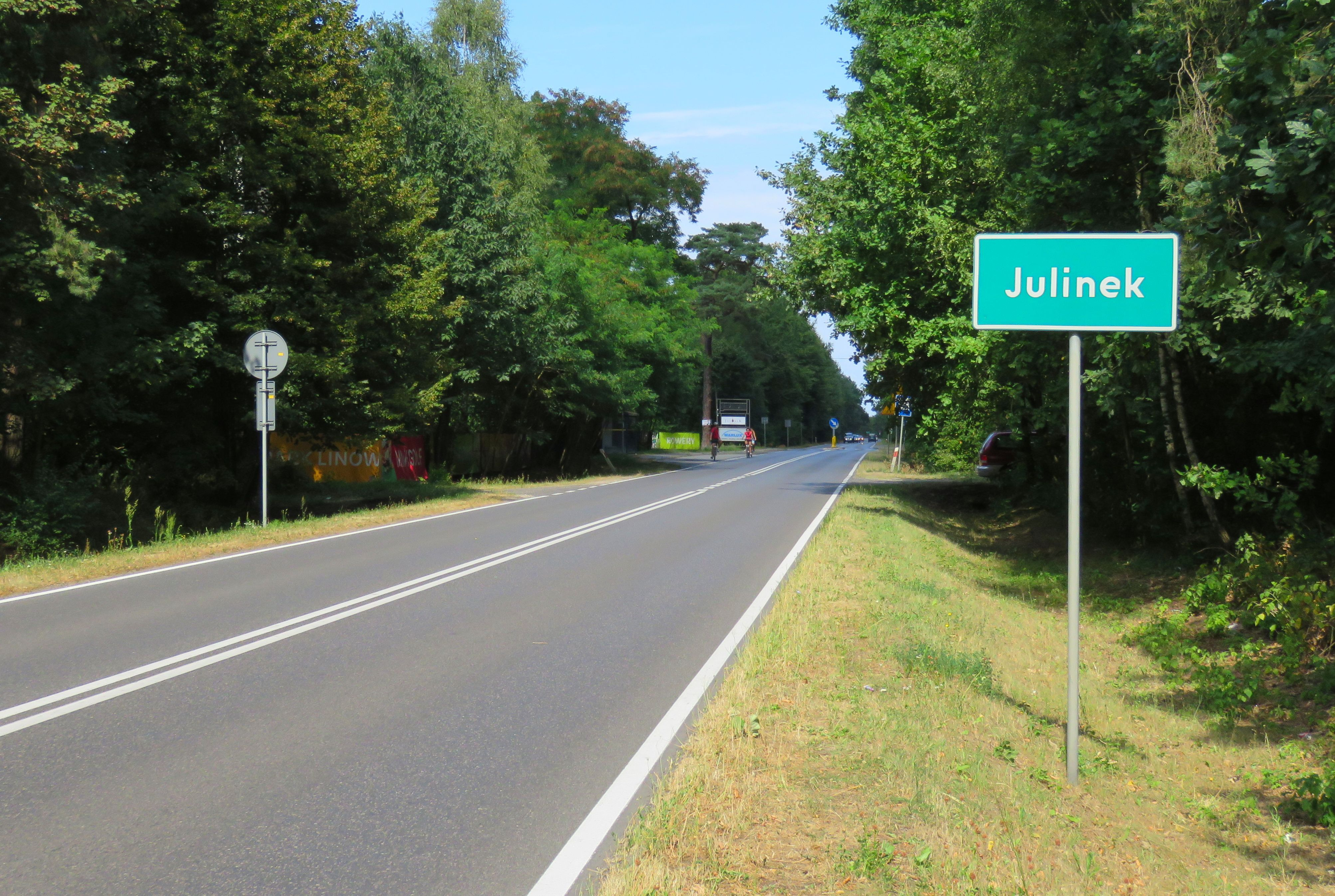
- Entering Julinek

- Location within Poland
- Coordinates: 52°16′31″N 20°35′28″E
- Country: Poland
- Voivodeship: Masovian
- County: Warsaw West
- Gmina: Leszno

Julinek [juˈlinɛk] is a village in the administrative district of Gmina Leszno, within Warsaw West County, Masovian Voivodeship, in east-central Poland.
