= Rob Clerc =

Dutch draughts grandmaster (born 1955)

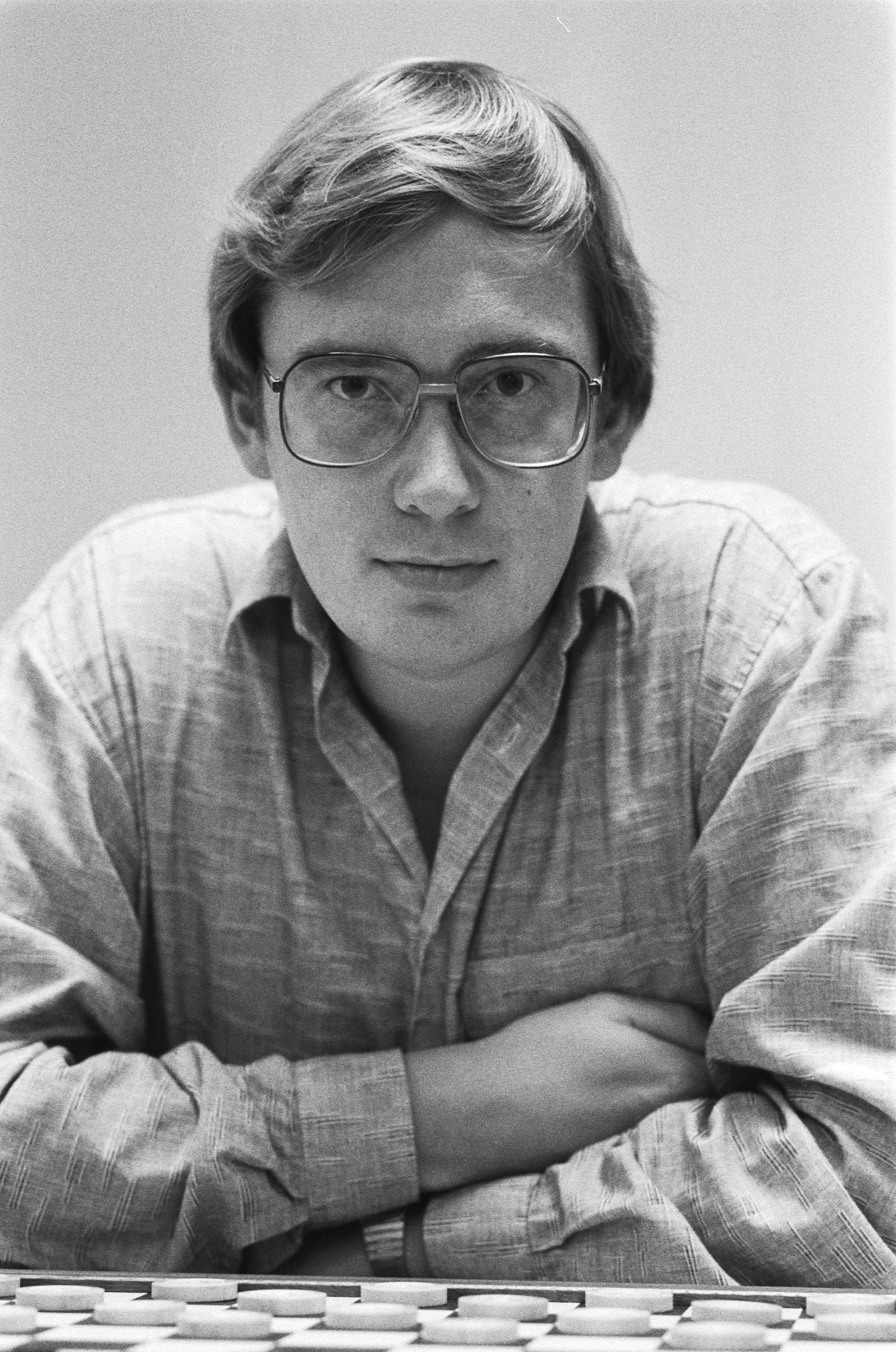
- Clerc in 1985

Personal information
- Born: August 9, 1955 (age 71) Amsterdam, Netherlands

Sport
- Country: Netherlands
- Sport: Draughts
- Rank: Grandmaster (1984)

Achievements and titles
- Highest world ranking: No. 3 (October 2022)
- Personal best: 2416 (October 2004, rating)

Rob Clerc (born 9 August 1955) is a Dutch draughts player. In 1976 he tied for second place at the Draughts World Championship. He was second place at the 1992 European championship held in Parthenay.
