= Alexander Baljakin =

Dutch draughts player

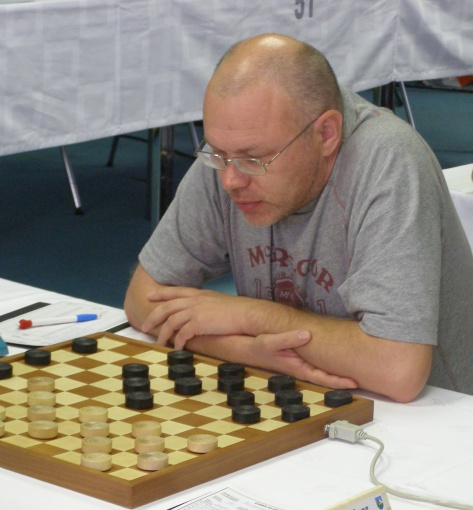

Personal information
- Born: April 8, 1961 (age 64); Arkhangelsk, Soviet Union

Sport
- Country: Netherlands
- Sport: Draughts

Alexander Baljakin (born 8 April 1961) is a Dutch draughts player born in the Russian city of Arkhangelsk. He is also a writer of books about draughts.

== Career ==
Baljakin became junior World Champion when he was still performing as a member of the Soviet team. In this period he became Soviet national champion in 1982, 1988 and 1989. He also won a gold medal at the Summer Olympiad in 1985 and as well as a silver at the World Championships in 1986. He won the Team World Cup in 1987.

He moved to Minsk in 1986 and after the fall of the Soviet Union he gained Belarusian citizenship, becoming national champion six consecutive times. He also won three bronze medals at the World Championships of 1992, 1994 and 1996 and was the Grandmasters Champion in 1995. In 1999 he won a silver medal at the rapid draughts World Championships.

In 2001 he moved to the Netherlands, gained Dutch citizenship and reached the A status which secures top sporters in the Netherlands money to live and focus on their sport. As a Dutchman he won a bronze medal at the 2005 World Championship Draughts in Amsterdam, while in 2007 he won the Balt Cup in Vilnius.

Baljakin has also written five books about draughts. Three of those together with Harm Wiersma in Dutch, one with Anatoli Gantvarg in English and one by himself in Dutch.

== Honours ==
- 1980 - World Championships (1st - gold medal) - juniors
- 1982 - Soviet Union Championships (1st - gold medal)
- 1985 - Summer Olympiad (1st - gold medal) - team
- 1986 - World Championships (2nd - silver medal)
- 1987 - World Cup (1st - gold medal) - team
- 1988 - Soviet Union Championships (1st - gold medal)
- 1989 - Soviet Union Championships (1st - gold medal)
- 1992 - World Championships (3rd - bronze medal)
- 1994 - World Championships (3rd - bronze medal)
- 1995 - Grandmasters 1995 (1st)
- 1996 - World Championships (3rd - bronze medal)
- 1999 - World Rapid Championships (2nd - silver medal)
- ???? - Belarusian Championships (1st - gold medal) six consecutive years
- 2000 - Open Dutch Championships (1st - gold medal)
- 2007 - Balt Cup (1st)
- 2009 - Dutch Championship (1st)
- 2011 - Dutch Championship (1st)

== Literature ==
- 1992 - De nationale toptraining 1992 (the national top training) - with Harm Wiersma (in Dutch)
- 1993 - De nationale toptraining 1993 (the national top training) - with Harm Wiersma (in Dutch)
- 1994 - De nationale toptraining 1994/95 (the national top training) - with Harm Wiersma (in Dutch)
- 1995 - Twelve Systems - with Anatoli Gantwarg (in English)
- 1997 - Schwarzmanie - about World Champion Alexander Schwarzman (in Dutch)
