= Vyacheslav Shchyogolev =

Russian draughts grandmaster (born 1940)

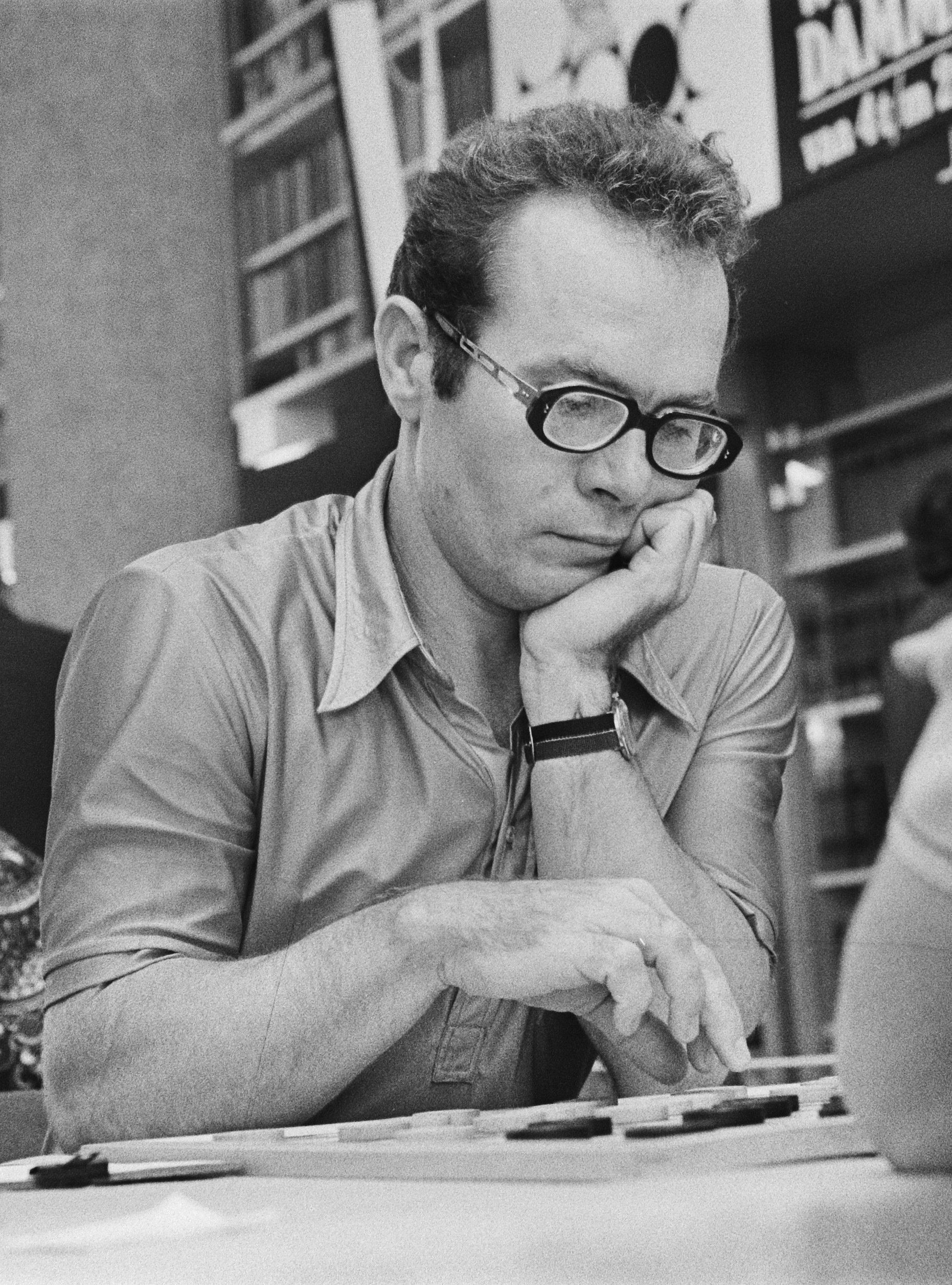
- Vyacheslav Shchyogolev in 1976

Personal information
- Born: December 30, 1940 (age 85) Moscow, Russian SFSR, Soviet Union

Sport
- Country: Russia
- Sport: Draughts
- Rank: Grandmaster (1984)

Achievements and titles
- Highest world ranking: No. 4 (January 1984)
- Personal best: 2387 (January 1984, rating)

Vyacheslav Ivanovich Shchyogolev (Russian: Вячеслав Иванович Щёголев; born 30 December 1940 in Moscow) is a Russian grandmaster in international draughts. He won two Draughts World Championships in 1960 and 1964, as well as four Soviet Union championships (1959, 1963, 1964 and 1976).

He wrote a book From beginner to champion (Russian: От новичка до чемпиона), where he praised draughts for shaping the player as a fighter, scientist and artist.
