= Roel Boomstra =

Dutch draughts grandmaster (born 1993)

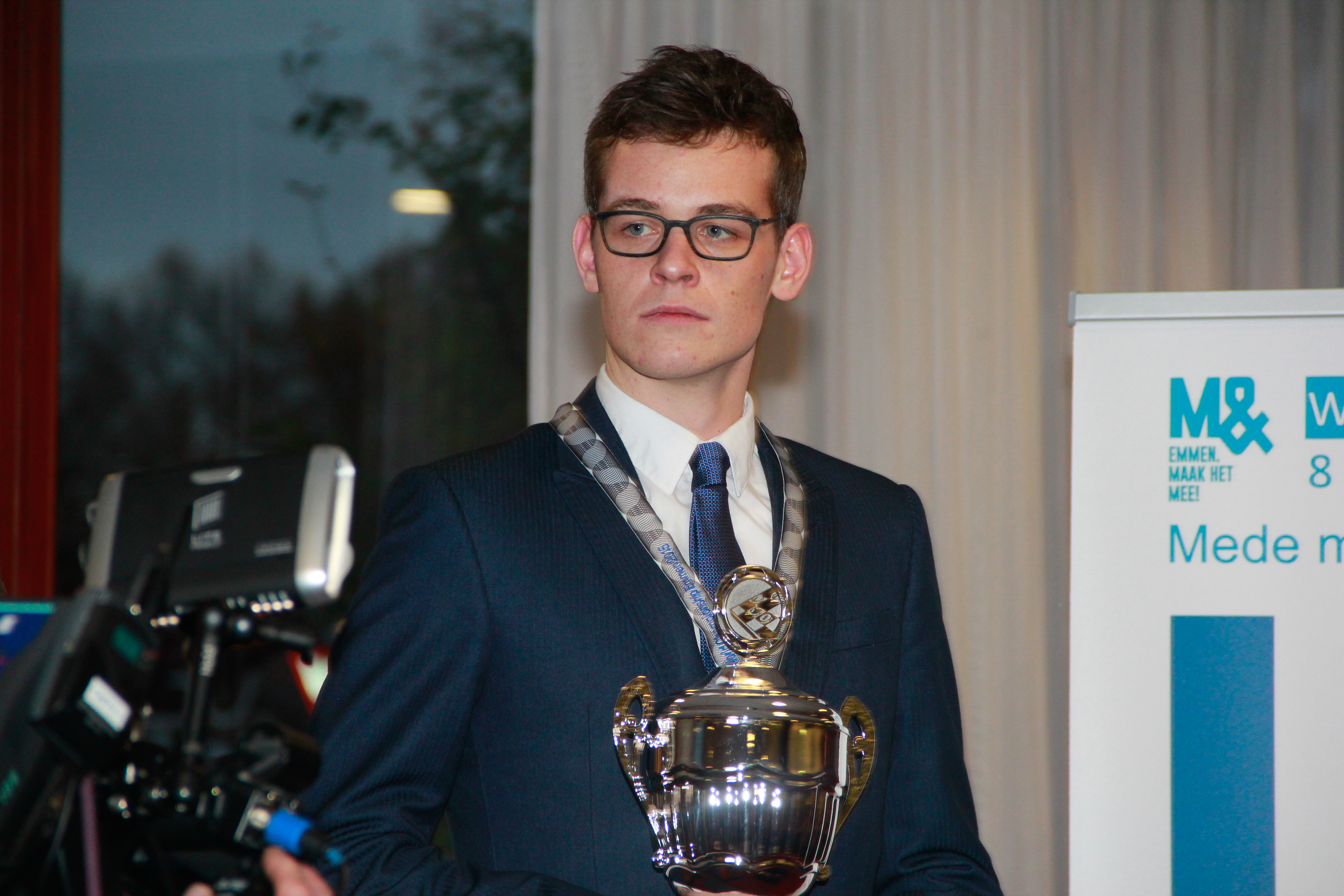
- Roel Boomstra at the 2015 World championship

Personal information
- Born: March 9, 1993 (age 33) Utrecht, Netherlands

Sport
- Country: Netherlands
- Sport: Draughts
- Rank: Grandmaster (2011)

Achievements and titles
- Highest world ranking: No. 1 (January 2023)
- Personal best: 2440 (April 2025, rating)

Roel Boomstra (born 9 March 1993) is a Dutch draughts player and former world champion. He won the Draughts World Championship match in 2016, 2018 and 2022. In 2014 Boomstra won the Draughts European Championship. He also won the Dutch championship twice (2012, 2015). Boomstra holds the title of International Grandmaster. He was born in Utrecht.

== World championship ==
- 2011 (7th place)
- 2013 (3rd place)
- 2015 (3rd place)
- 2016 (winner)
- 2017 (semifinal group C 5th-6th place)
- 2018 (winner)
- 2021 (3rd place)
- 2022 (winner)

Boomstra did not participate in the 2019 World Draughts Championship, because he decided to focus on his studies in physics.

== European championship ==
- 2006 (63rd place)
- 2010 (8th place)
- 2012 (12th place)
- 2014 (1 place)
- 2016 (2 place)

== Netherlands championship ==
- 2009 (3rd place)
- 2010 (2nd place)
- 2011 (2nd place)
- 2012 (1st place)
- 2013 (5th place)
- 2014 (2nd place)
- 2015 (1st place)
- 2018 (2nd place)
