= Marius Fabre =

French draughts player

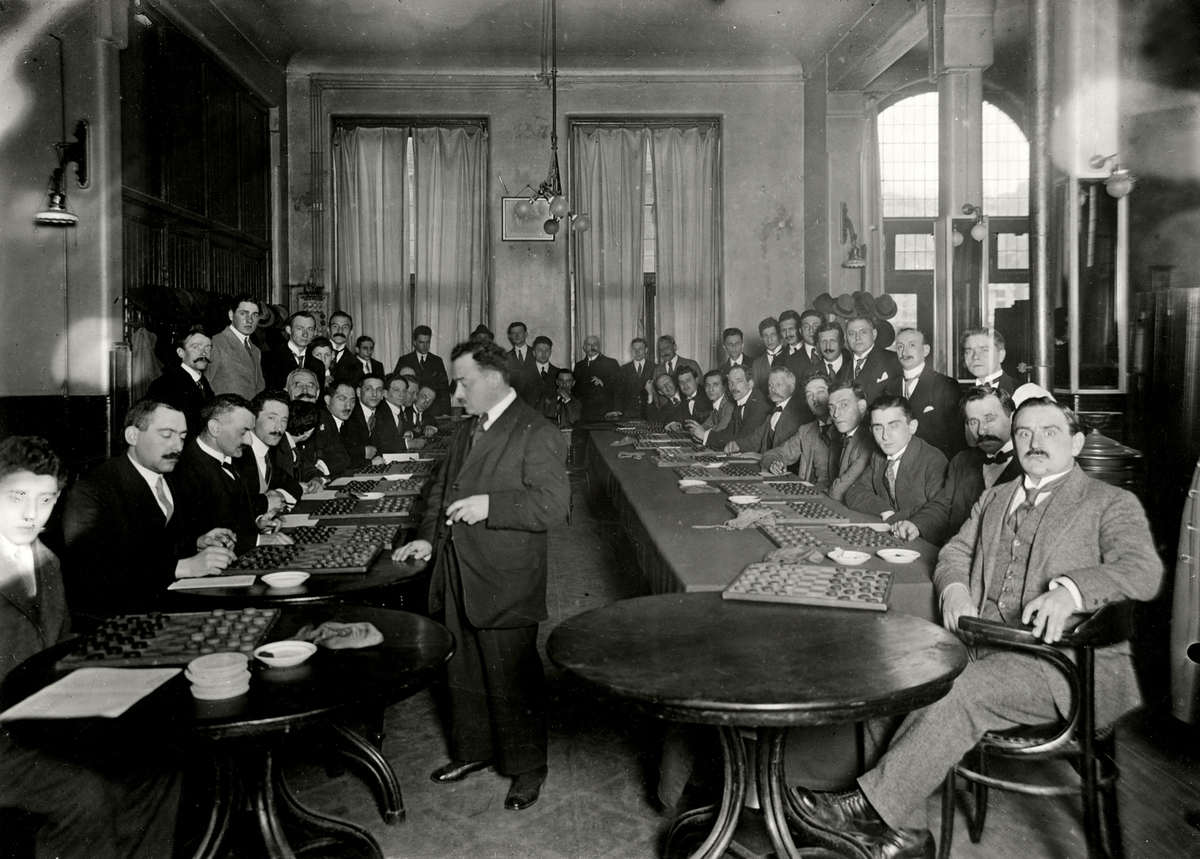
Marius Fabre, standing, at age 30.

Marius Fabre (Marseille, 18 April 1890 – Paris, 16 March 1945) was off-and-on world champion in International draughts from 1926 to 1931. The "Coup Fabre" move is named for him. He was French champion before that, having first won the French championship in 1921.
