= Ton Sijbrands =

Dutch draughts player (born 1949)

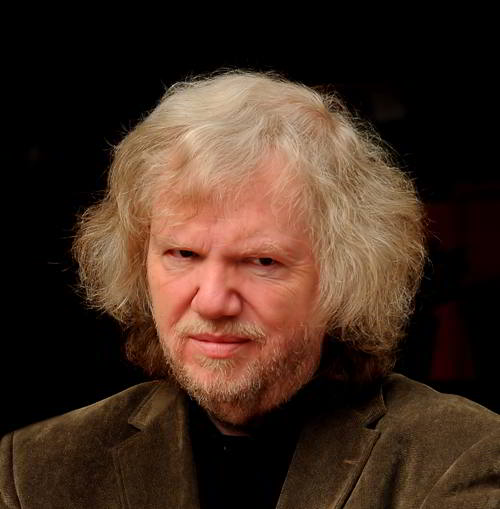
- Born: Teunis Sijbrands; December 15, 1949 (age 76); Amsterdam, Netherlands
- Known for: world draughts champion 1972

Teunis (Ton) Sijbrands (born 15 December 1949, in Amsterdam) is a Dutch international draughts player who became world champion in 1972. The next year, he successfully defended his title in a match against Andris Andreiko.

== Biography ==
In 1967, 1969, 1970, 1971, 1973 and 1988 he was the national Dutch champion. Sijbrands also had a weekly column about draughts in the Dutch national newspaper de Volkskrant and wrote several books about the game.

He also made major achievements in simultaneous blindfold draughts. In 2002 he won 17 games and played 5 draws from a total 22 games, which equals a score of approximately 88%.

On 18 December 2004, in the Dutch village of Lutten, Sijbrands improved the world record for blindfold simultaneous draughts. In this attempt that lasted 24 hours, he won 20 out of 24 games; the other 4 were draws, which equals a score of about 92%. At his next attempt, on 5 October 2007 at Tilburg University, he broke his own record again. This time he played 25 games, winning 21 and drawing 4. After losing the record to his compatriot Erno Prosman, Sijbrands regained it in September 2009 when he played 28 simultaneous games, winning 18, drawing 7, and losing 3. Prosman recovered the world record on 7 July 2012 in Gouda, Netherlands. He played 30 games, winning 17, losing 5 with 8 draws, a score of exactly 70%.

Sijbrands regained the world record once more on 19–21 December 2014 in Hilversum, Netherlands. He played 32 games with 14 wins and 18 draws.
