= Isidore Weiss =

French draughts player

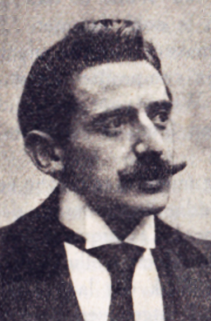
- Isidore Weiss (1895)

Personal information
- Nationality: French
- Born: 1867
- Died: June 12, 1936
- Years active: 1890s–1910s

Sport
- Sport: International draughts

Isidore Weiss (1867 – June 12, 1936) was a Frenchman who won seven world championships for international draughts from 1899 to 1911, a record not surpassed until Alexei Chizhov 85 years later.

In international draughts, the Coup Weiss is a refinement of the Coup de l'Expresse, named after him.
