= Alexei Chizhov =

Russian draughts grandmaster (born 1964)

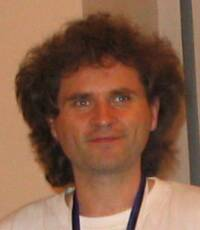

Personal information
- Born: October 15, 1964 (age 61) Izhevsk, Russian SFSR, Soviet Union

Sport
- Country: Russia
- Sport: Draughts
- Rank: Grandmaster (1988)

Achievements and titles
- Highest world ranking: No. 1 (July 1992)
- Personal best: 2471 (July 2003, rating)

Alexei Rudolfovich Chizhov (Russian: Алексей Рудольфович Чижов; born October 15, 1964, in Izhevsk, then part of Udmurtia, Russian SFSR) is a Russian draughts player who has won the International Draughts World Championship ten times. His first world championship title was in 1988, and his most recent was in 2005. His eighth world championship title, in 1996, broke Isidore Weiss's record of seven world championship titles—a record which had stood for 87 years. USSR national champion (1990), Russian national champion (2016). In 2003, Chizhov headed the World Draughts Federation.
