= Iser Kuperman =

Ukrainian draughts grandmaster (1922–2006)

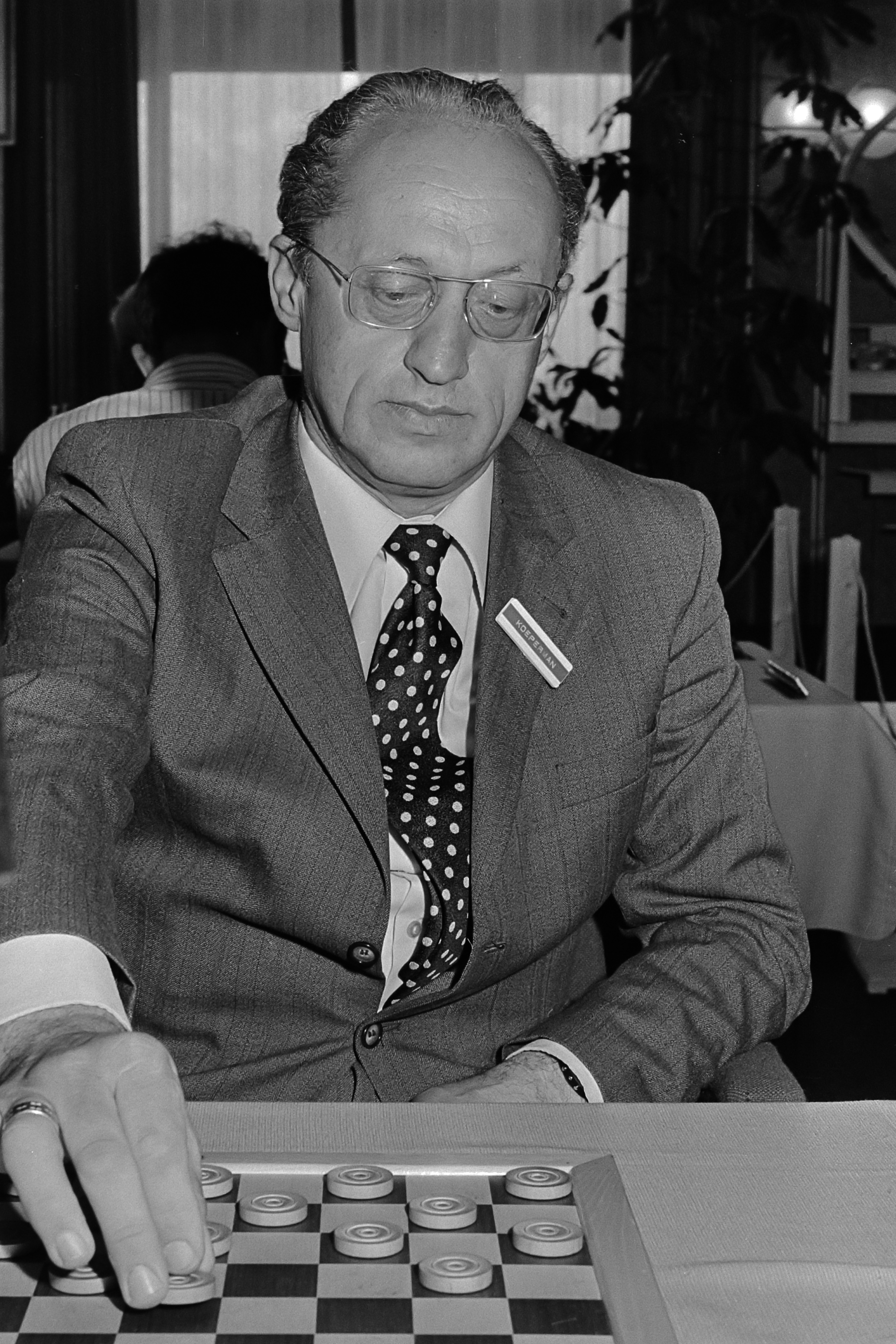
- Iser Kuperman in 1976

Personal information
- Born: April 21, 1922 Habne, Ukrainian SSR, Soviet Union
- Died: March 6, 2006 (aged 83) Boston, Massachusetts

Sport
- Country: Ukraine
- Sport: Draughts
- Rank: Grandmaster

Iser Kuperman, sometimes spelled Koeperman, (Russian: Исер Иосифович Куперман; April 21, 1922 - March 6, 2006) was a Ukrainian international draughts player. He had been the seven-time world champion, the four-time Panamerican champion, and multiple USSR champion in international and Russian draughts. He was also an International Grandmaster.

== Career ==
Iser Kuperman was born in Habne, Ukrainian SSR (now Poliske, Kiev Oblast) near Chernobyl on April 21, 1922 to a Jewish family. His family moved to Kyiv when he was a baby. In 1945, he made his debut in the USSR Russian draughts championship and won first place. After that, Kuperman took first place three times. At the age of 30, he began to play in international draughts and was USSR champion five times. Iser Kuperman was world champion in 1958, 1959, 1961, 1963, 1965, 1967, and 1974. He emigrated to Israel and then to the United States in 1978. After his emigration, any mention of him was purged from Soviet records.

After that, he became a Panamerican champion (1983, 1985, 1987 and 1995), a US champion in pool checkers, and won in their "Top Master" division from 1984 to 1990. This led him to be referred to as "The Greatest Pool Checkers Player of All Time" by the Homan Square Pool Checkers & Chess Club of Chicago.
