= Anatoli Gantvarg =

Belarusian draughts grandmaster (born 1948)

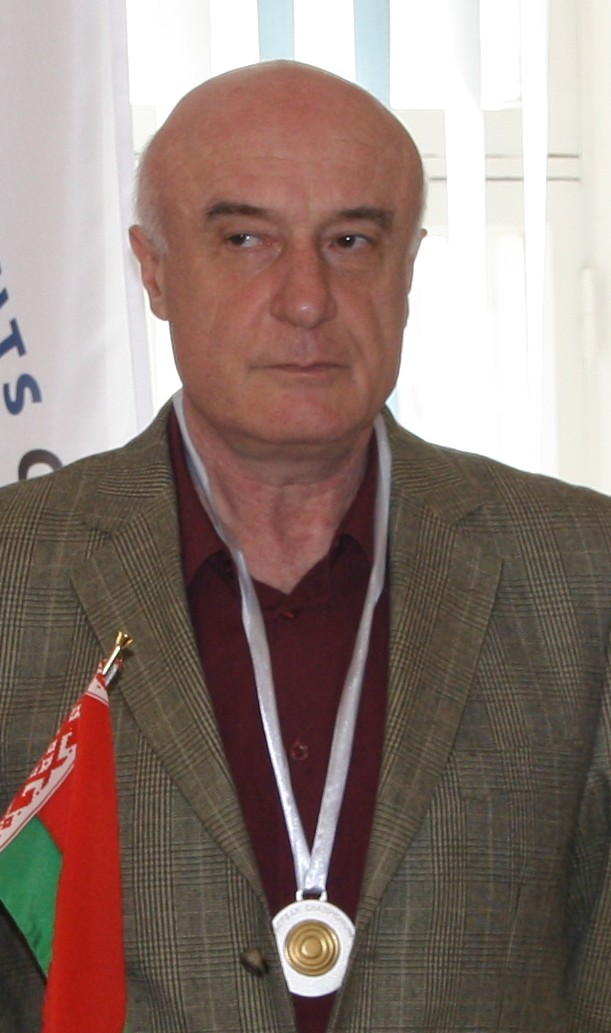
- Gantvarg in 2010

Personal information
- Born: October 3, 1948 (age 77) Minsk, Byelorussian SSR, Soviet Union

Sport
- Country: Belarus
- Sport: Draughts
- Rank: Grandmaster (1984)

Achievements and titles
- Highest world ranking: No. 4 (October 2019)
- Personal best: 2425 (January 1994, rating)

Anatoli Abramovich Gantvarg (Russian: Анатолий Абрамович Гантварг; born 3 October 1948 in Minsk) is an international grandmaster in international draughts from Belarus. He won the Draughts World Championships in 1978, 1980, 1984 and 1985, as well as four Soviet Union championships (1969–1981). In 1984 and 1985 he was selected as Belarus Sportsperson of the Year.

Gantvarg has a university degree in mathematics, but throughout all of his life, he remained a professional draughts player. He has two daughters: one lives in the United States and the other in Australia.

== Publications ==
- Gantvarg, A. A. (1986) 50 поединков на 100 клетках, Polymya
