= Andris Andreiko =

Latvian draughts player

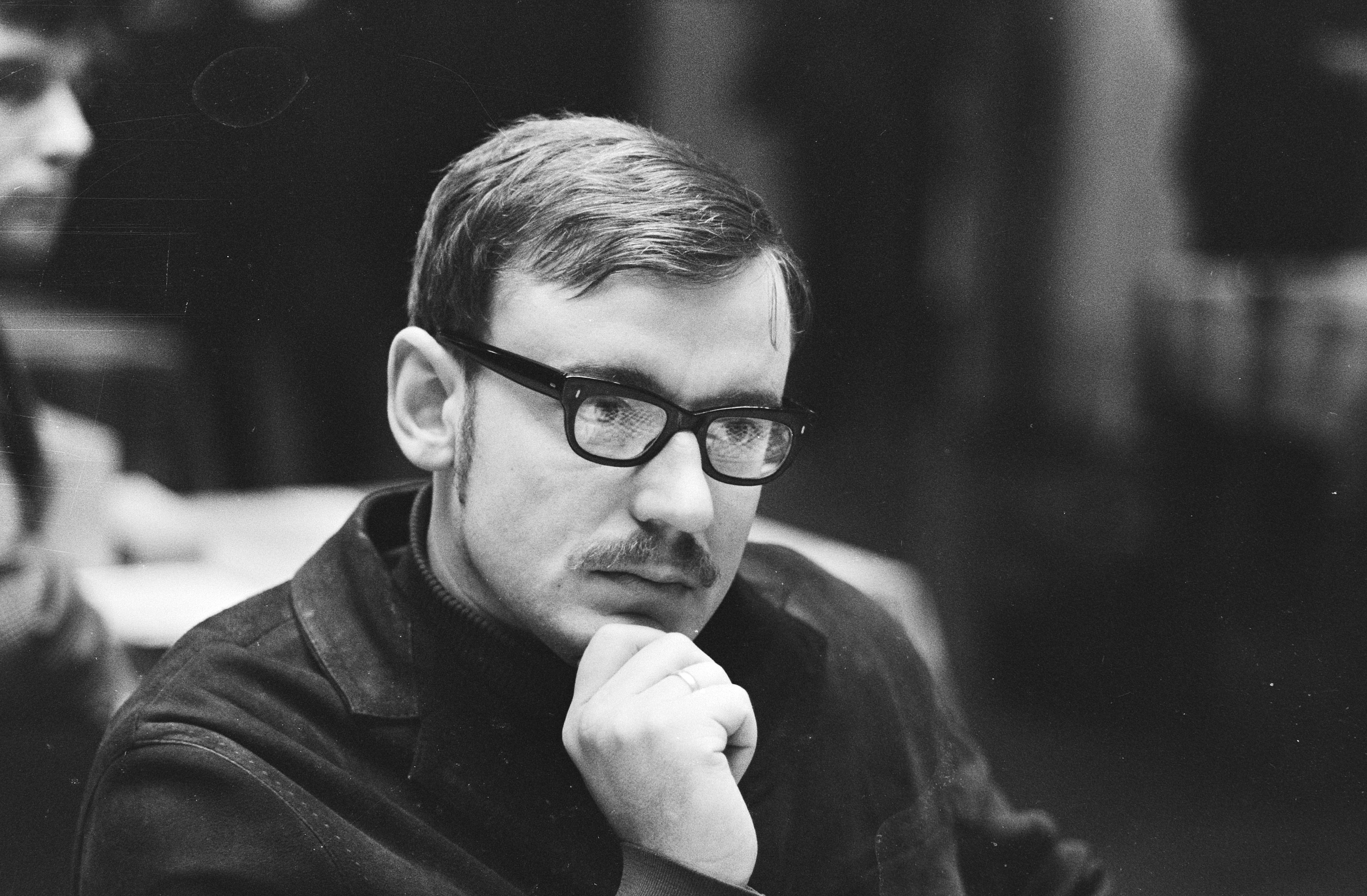
- Andris Andreiko in 1970

Personal information
- Nationality: Latvian
- Born: 17 October 1942 Riga, Latvia
- Died: 10 March 1976 (aged 33) Riga, Latvia

Sport
- Country: Soviet Union
- Sport: Draughts

Andris Andreiko (17 October 1942 – 10 March 1976) was a three-time (1968, 1969, 1972) world champion and European champion (1974) in draughts. He also won eight national titles in 1961, 1965, 1966, 1968, 1970–1972, 1975.

== Born ==
Andris Andreiko was born in Riga, Latvia In October 17, 1942.

== Death ==
Andreiko was an alcoholic, and met Igor Vasenin during an afternoon of drinking. After the two had a drink in Andreiko's apartment, Andreiko fell asleep. Noticing his prize money and luxury appliances, Vasenin decided to kill Andreiko. He wrapped an iron with a towel, hit Andreiko over the head 17 times, collected what he wanted and headed for the door. Incidentally, Andreiko's wife Lyubov, who did not live with him anymore, arrived at his apartment shortly after his murder. Vasenin answered the door and told her that Andreiko was meeting a woman and had asked not to be disturbed, but Lyubov suspected wrongdoing and went to a neighbor's apartment to call the police. Vasenin fled the apartment building before police arrived, but turned himself in soon after. Because of his surrender, he was sentenced to 15 years in prison rather than receiving the death penalty. An autopsy determined that the initial blow to Adreiko's head was the fatal.
