= Harm Wiersma =

Dutch politician

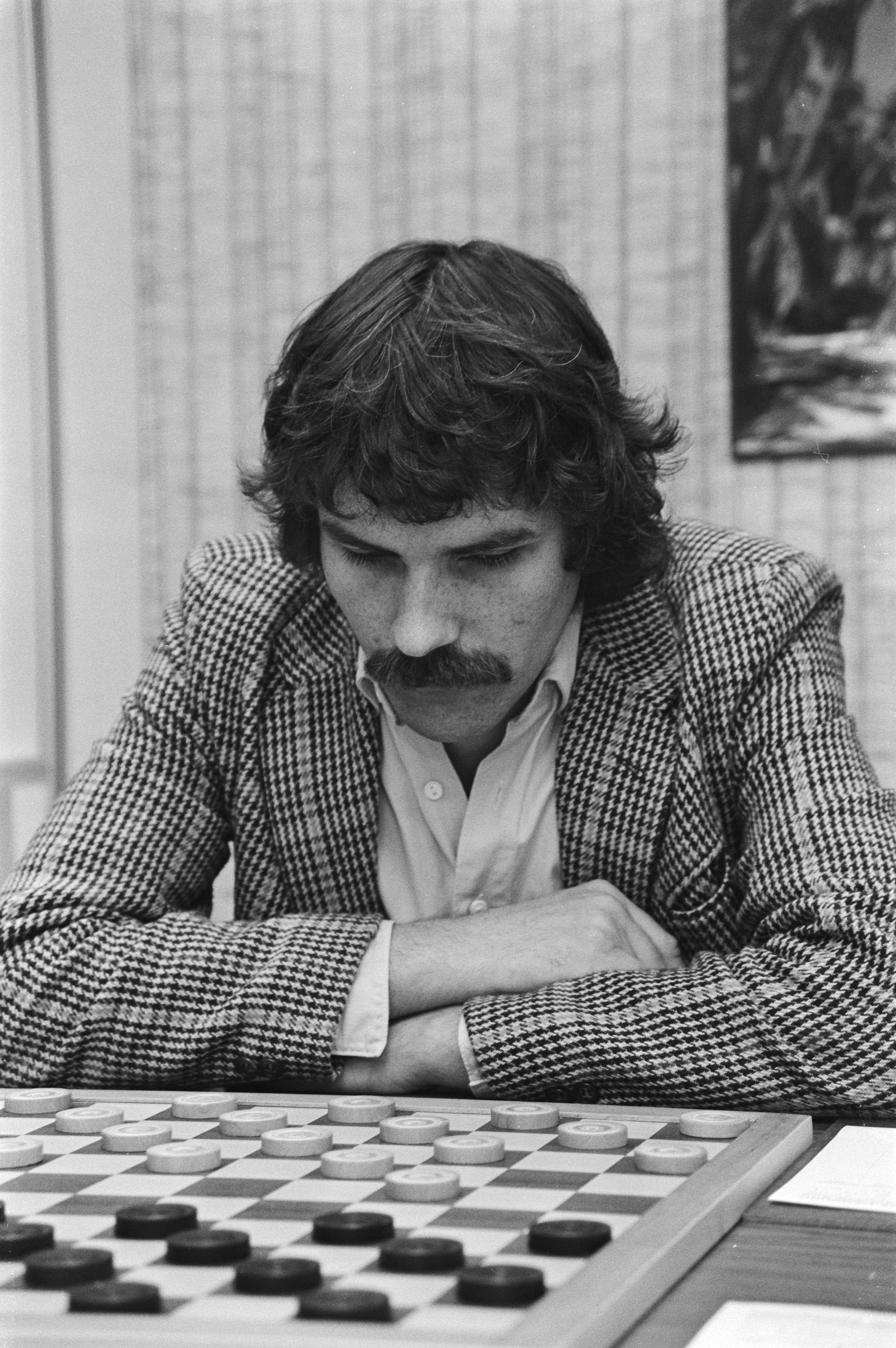
Harm Wiersma (1979)

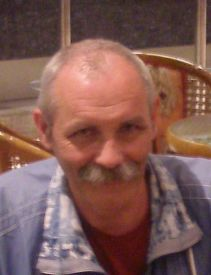
Harm Wiersma (2006)

Harm Wiersma (born 13 May 1953 in Leeuwarden, Dutch Frisia) is a Dutch draughts player and former politician. He is a six-time world champion in draughts and former MP.

== Biography ==
In draughts he won his first Dutch championship in 1972, but had been known in the field since age 14. His first world champion title took place in 1976 and his last occurred in 1984. He continued to be important in the game and won the European championship in 1999. He has also written on draughts.

His political career was short and troubled. He was strongly impressed with Pim Fortuyn and in a 2003 interview compared him to Desiderius Erasmus. Hence he became one of 26 members of the Pim Fortuyn List elected in 2002 with his main concern being Eastern Europe and sports. Harm Wiersma has worked with Eastern European companies. His son Joeri Wiersma who studied Governmentmanagement at the Thorbecke Academy worked as his personal assistant and is named after the film doctor Yuri Zhivago written by Boris Pasternak. Later he married a Russian wife and had two daughters. However he left the House of Representatives in the following year, 2003, due to difficulties in his municipality. (See LPF article for other difficulties that might have played a role) This exit, combined with his being a draughts player, has led to the pun that he is a "Dutch politician with a checkered past."

== Bibliography ==
- (in Dutch) Dam Miniaturen (1977), book about draughts
