= International draughts =

Strategy board game

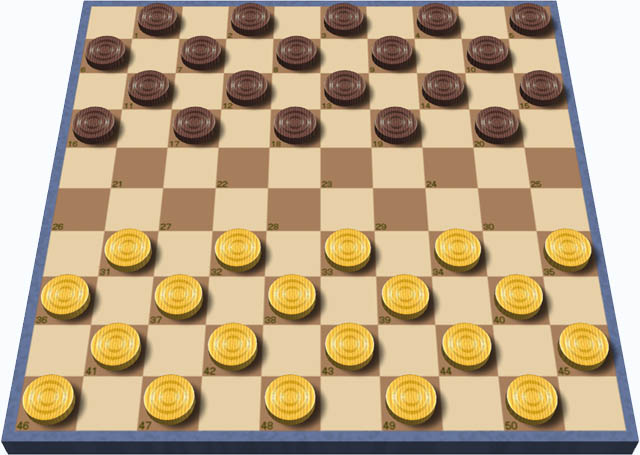
- International draughts starting position
- Genres: Board game; Abstract strategy game
- Players: 2
- Setup time: < 1 minute
- Chance: None
- Skills: Strategy, tactics
- Synonyms: International checkers; Polish draughts; 10×10 draughts; 10×10 checkers

International draughts (also called international checkers or Polish draughts) is a strategy board game for two players, one of the variants of draughts. The gameboard comprises 10×10 squares in alternating dark and light colours, of which only the 50 dark squares are used. Each player has 20 pieces, light for one player and dark for the other, at opposite sides of the board. In conventional diagrams, the board is displayed with the light pieces at the bottom; in this orientation, the lower-left corner square must be dark.

== History ==
According to Dutch draughts historian Arie van der Stoep, it is unknown where the 10×10 square draughts board first came into use. In the Netherlands, the board was probably used from 1550, and the number of pieces was extended to 2×20 between 1650 and 1700. The name "Polish draughts" was probably following a Dutch convention of the time that "unnatural" ideas were considered "Polish".

== Rules ==
The general rule is that all moves and captures are made diagonally. All references to squares refer to the dark squares only. The main differences from English draughts are: the size of the board (10×10), pieces can also capture backward (not only forward), the long-range moving and capturing capability of kings known as flying, and the requirement that the maximum number of men be captured whenever a player has capturing options.

=== Starting position ===
- The game is played on a board with 10×10 squares, alternatingly dark and light. The lower-leftmost square should be dark.
- Each player has 20 pieces. In the starting position (see illustration) the pieces are placed on the first four rows closest to the players. This leaves two central rows empty.

=== Moves and captures ===
Example of moves, including notation

- The player with the light pieces moves first. Then turns alternate.
- Ordinary pieces move one square diagonally forward to an unoccupied square when not capturing.
- Enemy pieces can and must be captured by jumping over the enemy piece, two squares forward or backward to an unoccupied square immediately beyond. If a jump is possible it must be done, even if doing so incurs a disadvantage.
  - Multiple successive jumps forward only in a single turn can and must be made if after each jump there is an unoccupied square immediately beyond the enemy piece. It is compulsory to jump over as many pieces as possible. One must play with the piece that can make the maximum number of captures.
  - A jumped piece is removed from the board at the end of the turn. (So for a multi-jump move, jumped pieces are not removed during the move, they are removed only after the entire multi-jump move is complete.)
  - The same piece may not be jumped more than once.

=== Crowning ===
- A piece is crowned if it stops on the far edge of the board at the end of its turn. Another piece is placed on top of it to mark it. Crowned pieces, sometimes called kings, can move freely multiple steps in any direction and may jump over and hence capture an opponent piece some distance away and choose where to stop afterwards, but must still capture the maximum number of pieces possible.

=== Winning and draws ===
- A player with no valid move remaining loses. This occurs if the player has no pieces left, or if all the player's pieces are obstructed from moving by opponent pieces.
- A game is a draw if neither opponent has the possibility to win the game.
- The game is considered a draw when the same position repeats itself for the third time (not necessarily consecutive), with the same player having the move each time.
- A king-versus-king endgame is automatically declared a draw, as is any other position proven to be a draw.

These are extra rules accommodated in some tournaments and may vary:

- If, during 25 moves, there were only king movements, without piece movements or jumps, the game is considered a draw.
- If there are only three kings, two kings and a piece, or a king and two pieces against a king, the game will be considered a draw after the two players have each played 16 turns.
- Before a proposal for a draw can be made, at least 40 moves must have been made by each player.

== Notation ==
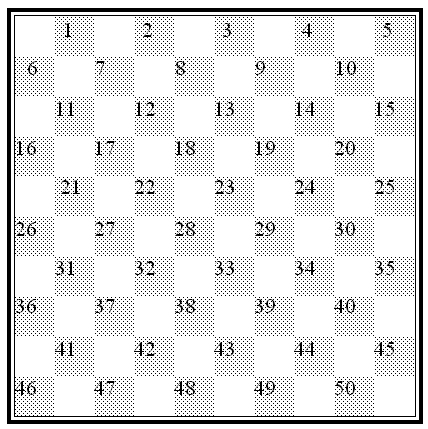
Notation: squares with their numbers

Each of the fifty dark squares has a number (1 through 50). Number 1 is at the top left corner seen from the player with the light pieces. Number 50 is at the top left corner seen from the player with the dark pieces. The top right corner seen from each player (Number 5 from the player with the light pieces and Number 46 from the player with the dark pieces) is the single corner.

== Sport ==
The first world championship was held in international draughts in 1894. It was won by Frenchman Isidore Weiss, who held the title for eighteen years with seven world championship titles. Then, for nearly sixty years, the title was held by representatives from either France or the Netherlands, including Herman Hoogland, Stanislas Bizot, Marius Fabre, Ben Springer, Maurice Raichenbach, Pierre Ghestem, and Piet Roozenburg. In 1956, the hegemony of the French and the Dutch was broken: the champion was Canadian Marcel Deslauriers. In 1958, the USSR's Iser Kuperman became the world champion, beginning the era of Soviet domination in international draughts, a feat which would mirror their domination at chess around this time.

The official status of the world championships has been held under the auspices of the World Draughts Federation (FMJD) since 1948. In 1998, the first World Championship was held in the blitz format. The first Women's World Championship was held in 1973. The first women's champion was Elena Mikhailovskaya from the Soviet Union. A World Junior Championship has been contested since 1971; the first winner was Nicholay Mischansky.

In addition to the World Championships, there have also been European Championships since 1965 (men) and 2000 (women).

The World Draughts Federation maintains a ranking. As of 1 October 2025, the men's list is headed by Jan Groenendijk and Roel Boomstra, both from the Netherlands. The women's list is headed by Darya Tkachenko, representing the Netherlands.

== Computers ==
Computer draughts programs have been improving every year. The first draughts programs were written in the mid-1970s. The first computer draughts tournament took place in 1987. In 1993, computer draughts program Truus ranked about 40th in the world. In 2003 computer draughts program Buggy beat world number 8 Samb. In 2005, the 10-time world champion and 2005 World champion, Alexei Chizhov, commented that he could not beat the computer, but he also would not lose to the computer. In 2010, the 9 piece endgame database was built.

=== Schwarzman beat Maximus (2012) ===
Alexander Schwarzman beat computer program Maximus on 14 April, 2012. Schwarzman won game 2 in the 6-game match. The other 5 games were draws. Schwarzman was world champion in 1998, 2007, and 2009. Jan-Jaap van Horssen of the Netherlands wrote Maximus. Maximus used a six-piece endgame database. The computer was an Intel core i7-3930K at 3.2 GHz 32 gigabytes memory; it had six cores with hyperthreading. The average search depth was 24.5 ply. The average number of moves evaluated per second was 23,357,000. The average search time was 3 minutes and 52.98 seconds.

=== List of top international draughts programs ===
- Scan by Fabien Letouzey
- KingsRow by Ed Gilbert
- Dragon Draughts
- Damage by Bert Tuyt
- Damy
- Maximus
- AI by draughts.io

Some older well known programs are:

- Truus
- Flits

=== Computer tournament winners ===
- Culemborg 2013 Dragon Draughts
- Culemborg 2012 Dragon Draughts
- Culemborg 2011 Maximus
- Culemborg 2010 Damage
- Culemborg 2009 Damy

== See also ==
- Dameo
- Hexdame – international draughts rules applied to a hexagonal board
- List of Draughts European Championship winners
- List of Draughts World Championship winners
- List of women's Draughts European Championship winners
- List of women's Draughts World Championship winners
