= 2017 World Russian Draughts Championship =

The 2017 World Draughts-64 Championship held in Saint Peterburg, Russia. 64 players from Europe, Asia, Africa, North America, and South America competed in the tournament, which started on October 20, 2017, and ended on October 28, 2017. The tournament was played in hotel «Moscow». The winning prize for the tournament was about three million rubles (about US$52,000). At the same time, the Women's World Draughts Championship was held. Championship played in classic (at the Russian draughts), rapid (at the Brazilian draughts) and blitz (at the Russian draughts) formats.

== Classic program ==
=== Rules and regulations ===
In the first stage participants played Swiss-system tournament with 8 rounds. To define the places with equal points used of Buchholz system. The first 16 participated in the final. The final was in the play-off form. Two points were given for each win, one point for each draw, no points for each loss. Players from 17 to 64 played additionally Swiss-system tournament with 2 rounds.

The final classification is based on the total points obtained. If two or more players have the same total points to define the places:

1. Number of points scored by all competitors (Buchholz coefficient)
2. Number of points scored by opponents, excluding the lowest result (reduced Solkof coefficient)
3. Match up to the first victory with a shorter time controls: a classic game — 5’+3” till the end of the game for each participant.

=== Preliminary stage ===
GMI — international grandmaster

MI — international master

MF — master FMJD

Place	Name	Country	Title	Rating	Points	Buchholz coeff.	Reduced Solkof coeff.
1.	Vladimir Egorov	Russia	GMI	2496	11	80	
2.	Damir Rysaev	Russia	MI	2335	11	79	72(-1)
3.	Andrus Kibartas	Lithuania	GMI	2419	11	79	71(-1)
4.	Arunas Norvaisas	Lithuania	GMI	2416	11	76	70(-1)
5.	Domantas Norkus	Lithuania	MI	2341	11	76	69(-1)
6.	Mirat Zhekeev	Kazakhstan	GMI	2375	11	73	
7.	Igor Mikhalchenko	Belarus	GMI	2458	11	72	
8.	Gavril Kolesov	Russia	GMI	2481	11	69	
9.	Sergey Belosheev	Russia	GMI	2500	11	67	
10.	Nikolai Guliaev	Russia	MF	2359	11	66	
11.	Oleg Dashkov	Russia	GMI	2476	10	77	
12.	Ion Dosca	Moldova	GMI	2433	10	74	
13.	Dmitriy Tsinman	Russia	GMI	2475	10	70	
14.	Vladyslav Mazur	Ukraine	GMI	2383	10	69	
15.	Michael Semyaniuk	Belarus	MI	2368	10	67	
16.	Vladyslav Antonovich	Ukraine	MI	2261	10	66	
17.	Andrei Valyuk	Belarus	GMI	2495	9	78	
18.	Arno Uutma	Estonia	GMI	2301	9	76	
19.	Vladimir Skrabov	Russia	GMI	2495	9	75	
20.	Nicolay Struchkov	Russia	GMI	2447	9	74	66(-1) 58(-2) 50(-3) 42(-4)
21.	Aliaksei Kunitsa	Belarus	MI	2241	9	74	66(-1) 58(-2) 50(-3) 41(-4)
22.	Genadij Shapiro	Germany	GMI	2369	9	71	
23.	Denis Shkatula	Ukraine	MI	2379	9	70	
24.	Vilius Aleknavicius	Lithuania	MI	2306	9	67	63(-1)
25.	Andrei Gnelitskii	Russia	MI	2331	9	67	62(-1)
26.	Madalitso Thomu Juma	Malawi		2100	9	67	60(-1)
27.	Aleksandr Burov	Russia	GMI	2404	9	64	
28.	Denis Dudco	Moldova	MI	2425	9	62	
29.	Eugeny Kondrachenko	Belarus	GMI	2398	8	74	
30.	Alisher Artikov	Uzbekistan	GMI	2245	8	73	
31.	Samandar Kalanov	Uzbekistan	GMI	2311	8	71	65(-1)
32.	Martins Junkurens	Latvia	MF	2243	8	71	64(-1)
33.	Dmitrii Lond	Russia		2243	8	68	64(-1)
34.	Dmitrii Melnikov	Russia	MI	2313	8	68	62(-1)
35.	Marcelo Francisco	Brazil	MI	2154	8	65	
36.	Farhad Arslanov	Turkmenistan	MF	2138	8	64	60(-1)
37.	Ruslan Pescherov	Russia	MI	2327	8	64	59(-1)
38.	Choisuren Burmaa	Mongolia		2100	8	61	
39.	Lukanga Mambwe	Zambia		2130	8	60	
40.	Alexander Bleicher	Germany	MF	2214	8	59	
41.	Diogenes Chong	Jamaica		2100	8	51	
42.	Anton Van Berkel	Netherlands		2117	7	63	57(-1) 51(-2)
43.	Mwamba Richard Muganza	Democratic Republic of the Congo	GMI	2167	7	63	57(-1) 50(-2)
44.	Ed Pergament	United States		2100	7	58	
45.	Aslan Aslanli	Azerbaijan	MI	2283	7	56	
46.	Patrick Umala	Uganda		2100	7	55	
47.	Sudian Suckram	Jamaica		1900	7	54	51(-1)
48.	Wayne Alphonso Reid	Jamaica		2100	7	54	50(-1)
49.	Stepan Kovalenko	Kazakhstan		2082	7	52	
50.	Clifford Tsamba	Zimbabwe		2125	6	62	58(-1)
51.	Krzysztof Juszczak	Poland		2137	6	62	56(-1)
52.	Dan Isabirye	Uganda	MF	2171	6	58	
53.	Jerve Muangu	Republic of the Congo	MF	2085	6	52	
54.	David Khabuliani	Georgia		2100	6	51	
55.	Frank Laurent	France	MF	2134	6	47	47(-1) 43(-2) 37(-3) 31(-4) 24(-5) 17(-6)
56.	Ephrame Demissie Woldegeorgis	Ethiopia		2100	6	47	47(-1) 43(-2) 37(-3) 31(-4) 24(-5) 16(-6)
57.	Bogdan Yanev	Bulgaria	MF	2071	6	42	42(-1) 39(-2)
58.	Bekele Getachew Temtime	Ethiopia		2100	6	42	42(-1) 38(-2)
59.	Edijs Novickis	Malta	MF	2179	5	52	
60.	Celso Cipriano	Mozambique		2100	4	59	
61.	Nshan Alaverdyan	Armenia		2100	4	57	
62.	Yuri Goldshtein	Israel		2085	4	52	
63.	Horacio Lourenco	Mozambique		2100	3	43	
64.	Timofey Fagbemiro	Nigeria		2004	0	51	

=== Quarterfinals ===
1-8 places

Place	Name	Classic	Rapid	Blitz
1	(Russia) Vladimir Egorov	1	1	2
8	(Russia) Gavril Kolesov	1	1	0

Place	Name	Classic	Rapid	Blitz
2	(Belarus) Igor Mikhalchenko	1	1	2
7	(Russia) Damir Rysaev	1	1	0

Place	Name	Classic	Rapid	Blitz
3	(Lithuania) Andrus Kibartas	1	1	2
6	(Kazakhstan) Mirat Zhekeev	1	1	2

Place	Name	Classic	Rapid	Blitz
4	(Lithuania) Arunas Norvaisas	1	2	
5	(Lithuania) Domantas Norkus	1	0	

9-16 places

Place	Name	Classic	Rapid	Blitz
9	(Russia) Sergey Belosheev	1	2	
16	(Ukraine) Vladyslav Antonovich	1	0	

Place	Name	Classic	Rapid	Blitz
10	(Russia) Nikolai Guliaev	1	0	
15	(Belarus) Michael Semyaniuk	1	2	

Place	Name	Classic	Rapid	Blitz
11	(Russia) Oleg Dashkov	1	2	
14	(Ukraine) Vladyslav Mazur	1	0	

Place	Name	Classic	Rapid	Blitz
12	(Moldova) Ion Dosca	1	1	0
13	(Russia) Dmitriy Tsinman	1	1	2

=== Semifinal ===
For 1-4 places

Name	Classic	Rapid	Blitz
(Russia) Vladimir Egorov	1	0	
(Belarus) Igor Mikhalchenko	1	2	

Name	Classic	Rapid	Blitz
(Lithuania) Andrus Kibartas	1	2	
(Lithuania) Arunas Norvaisas	1	0	

For 5-8 places

Name	Classic	Rapid	Blitz
(Russia) Damir Rysaev	1	0	
(Russia) Gavril Kolesov	1	2	

Name	Classic	Rapid	Blitz
(Lithuania) Domantas Norkus	1	1	0
(Kazakhstan) Mirat Zhekeev	1	1	2

For 9-12 places

Name	Classic	Rapid	Blitz
(Russia) Sergey Belosheev	1	2	
(Belarus) Michael Semyaniuk	1	0	

Name	Classic	Rapid	Blitz
(Russia) Oleg Dashkov	1	1	0
(Russia) Dmitriy Tsinman	1	1	2

For 13-16 places

Name	Classic	Rapid	Blitz
(Russia) Nikolai Guliaev	1	1	2
(Ukraine) Vladyslav Antonovich	1	1	0

Name	Classic	Rapid	Blitz
(Moldova) Ion Dosca	1	1	2
(Ukraine) Vladyslav Mazur	1	1	0

== Final ==
=== Match for 1 place ===
Name	Classic	Rapid	Blitz
(Lithuania) Andrus Kibartas	1	0	
(Belarus) Igor Mikhalchenko	1	2	

=== Match for 3 place ===
Name	Classic	Rapid	Blitz
(Russia) Vladimir Egorov	2		
(Lithuania) Arunas Norvaisas	0		

=== Match for 5 place ===
Name	Classic	Rapid	Blitz
(Kazakhstan) Mirat Zhekeev	0		
(Russia) Gavril Kolesov	2		

=== Match for 7 place ===
Name	Classic	Rapid	Blitz
(Russia) Damir Rysaev	1	0	
(Lithuania) Domantas Norkus	1	2	

=== Match for 9 place ===
Name	Classic	Rapid	Blitz
(Russia) Sergey Belosheev	1	1	0
(Russia) Dmitriy Tsinman	1	1	2

=== Match for 11 place ===
Name	Classic	Rapid	Blitz
(Russia) Oleg Dashkov	2		
(Belarus) Michael Semyaniuk	0		

=== Match for 13 place ===
Name	Classic	Rapid	Blitz
(Russia) Nikolai Guliaev	1	0	
(Moldova) Ion Dosca	1	2	

=== Match for 15 place ===
Name	Classic	Rapid	Blitz
(Ukraine) Vladyslav Mazur	1	2	
(Ukraine) Vladyslav Antonovich	1	0	

=== Final standing ===
Place	Name	Country
1.	Igor Mikhalchenko	Belarus
2.	Andrus Kibartas	Lithuania
3.	Vladimir Egorov	Russia
4.	Arunas Norvaisas	Lithuania
5.	Gavril Kolesov	Russia
6.	Mirat Zhekeev	Kazakhstan
7.	Domantas Norkus	Lithuania
8.	Damir Rysaev	Russia
9.	Dmitriy Tsinman	Russia
10.	Sergey Belosheev	Russia
11.	Oleg Dashkov	Russia
12.	Michael Semyaniuk	Belarus
13.	Ion Dosca	Moldova
14.	Nikolai Guliaev	Russia
15.	Vladyslav Mazur	Ukraine
16.	Vladyslav Antonovich	Ukraine
17.	Andrei Valyuk	Belarus
18.	Vladimir Skrabov	Russia
19.	Aliaksei Kunitsa	Belarus
20.	Denis Dudco	Moldova
21.	Samandar Kalanov	Uzbekistan
22.	Nicolay Struchkov	Russia
23.	Denis Shkatula	Ukraine
24.	Vilius Aleknavicius	Lithuania
25.	Andrei Gnelitskii	Russia
26.	Aleksandr Burov	Russia
27.	Eugeny Kondrachenko	Belarus
28.	Alisher Artikov	Uzbekistan
29.	Martins Junkurens	Latvia
30.	Marcelo Francisco	Brazil
31.	Arno Uutma	Estonia
32.	Genadij Shapiro	Germany
33.	Madalitso Thomu Juma	Malawi
34.	Dmitrii Lond	Russia
35.	Dmitrii Melnikov	Russia
36.	Farhad Arslanov	Turkmenistan
37.	Ruslan Pescherov	Russia
38.	Lukanga Mambwe	Zambia
39.	Alexander Bleicher	Germany
40.	Mwamba Richard Muganza	Democratic Republic of the Congo
41.	Patrick Umala	Uganda
42.	Dan Isabirye	Uganda
43.	Anton Van Berkel	Netherlands
44.	Aslan Aslanli	Azerbaijan
45.	Wayne Alphonso Reid	Jamaica
46.	Clifford Tsamba	Zimbabwe
47.	Choisuren Burmaa	Mongolia
48.	Diogenes Chong	Jamaica
49.	Ed Pergament	United States
50.	Sudian Suckram	Jamaica
51.	Krzysztof Juszczak	Poland
52.	Jerve Muangu	Republic of the Congo
53.	David Khabuliani	Georgia
54.	Frank Laurent	France
55.	Bogdan Yanev	Bulgaria
56.	Bekele Getachew Temtime	Ethiopia
57.	Stepan Kovalenko	Kazakhstan
58.	Ephrame Demissie Woldegeorgis	Ethiopia
59.	Edijs Novickis	Malta
60.	Nshan Alaverdyan	Armenia
61.	Celso Cipriano	Mozambique
62.	Yuri Goldshtein	Israel
63.	Horacio Lourenco	Mozambique
64.	Timofey Fagbemiro	Nigeria

== Rapid program ==
In the first stage participants played Swiss-system tournament with 9 rounds at Brazilian draughts. The first 4 participated in the semifinal and final.

The classification is based on the total points obtained. If two or more players had the same total points, the following was used to decide the placings:

1. Number of points scored by opponents, excluding the lowest result (reduced Solkof coefficient)

2. Number of points scored by all competitors (Buchholz coefficient)

There were 72 participants from 43 countries.

Time control: 7’+5” till the end of the game for each participant.

=== Results ===
Place	Name	Country
1.	Igor Mikhalchenko	Belarus
2.	Gavril Kolesov	Russia
3.	Sergey Belosheev	Russia

== Blitz program ==
In the first stage participants played Swiss-system tournament with 9 rounds at Russian version draughts. The first 4 participated in the semifinal and final.

The classification is based on the total points obtained. If two or more players will have same total points to define the places:

1. Number of points scored by all competitors (Buchholz coefficient)

2. Number of points scored by opponents, excluding the lowest result (reduced Solkof coefficient)

There were 74 participants from 43 countries.

Time control: 3’+2” till the end of the game for each participant.

=== Results ===
Place	Name	Country
1.	Gavril Kolesov	Russia
2.	Igor Mikhalchenko	Belarus
3.	Oleg Dashkov	Russia
