= Vladimir Vigman =

Latvian draughts player and journalist

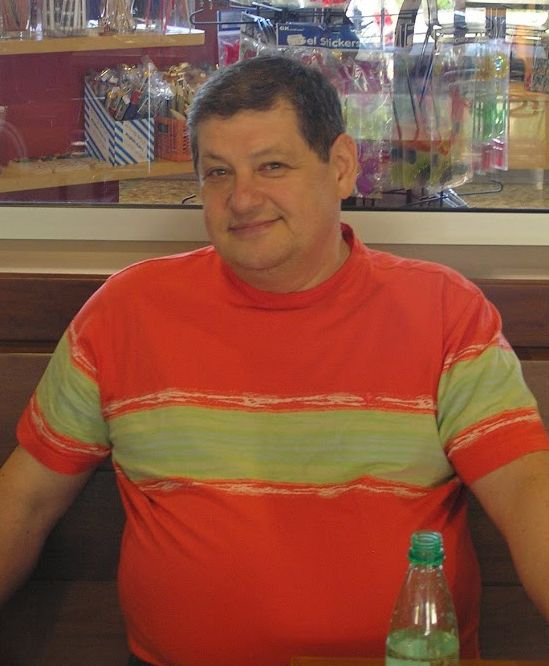
- Vladimir Vigman in Salou Open-2009.

Personal information
- Full name: Владимир Яковлевич Вигман
- Born: May 10, 1952 (age 74) Riga, Latvian SSR

Sport
- Country: Latvia
- Sport: International draughts

Achievements and titles
- World finals: 1985 World Draughts-64 Championships — Silver; 1987 World Draughts-64 Championships — Silver; 1989 World Draughts-64 Championships — Silver

Vladimir Vigman (Russian: Владимир Яковлевич Вигман; Latvian: Vladimirs Vigmans; born May 10, 1952 in Riga) is a Latvian draughts player in International draughts and Draughts-64. Three-times was second at World Draughts-64 Championships (Brazilian draughts) (1985, 1987, 1989), three-times USSR champion in Russian draughts (1976–1978), draughts trainer and journalist, author of books on draughts. International grandmaster in International, Brazilian and Russian draughts.

== Sport achievements ==
In 1968 Vigman got the title of national master. In 1970 he won the silver medal in USSR championship at Russian draughts, then from 1976 to 1978 he won the gold medal. In 1978 he became a national grandmaster. He also participated in the USSR championship of International draughts.

In 1984 Vigman took sixth place at World Draughts Championships in Dakar. At the first World Draughts-64 Championships (of Brazilian draughts) in 1985 he was second place after Aleksander Kandaurov. He was also second after Alexander Schwarzman at the next championships in 1987. At the third championships in 1989 Vladimir Vigman had the same result as Alexander Schwarzman, but became second place again because at that moment there was a rule which gave preference to the current world champion.

Since 2007 Vigman has played in Salou Open.

As a sports journalist, he began to work in the journal «Шашки» in 1971 (Riga) and later became its Chief Editor. In 1986 Vigman wrote a book about draughts named Радость творчества. In 1991 he published his next book Grand Master, Surrender! which contains 300 matches of a draughts grandmaster.

Vigman invented a variant of draughts in which each player have 24 pieces (two full sets) – one on the white squares, the other on the black. Each player plays both games simultaneously: one game on the white squares, the other on the dark squares. The total result is the sum of the results of both games.

== Vigman's draughts ==
Position: a8 black circle, b8 black circle, c8 black circle, d8 black circle, e8 black circle, f8 black circle, g8 black circle, h8 black circle, a7 black circle, b7 black circle, c7 black circle, d7 black circle, e7 black circle, f7 black circle, g7 black circle, h7 black circle, a6 black circle, b6 black circle, c6 black circle, d6 black circle, e6 black circle, f6 black circle, g6 black circle, h6 black circle, a3 white circle, b3 white circle, c3 white circle, d3 white circle, e3 white circle, f3 white circle, g3 white circle, h3 white circle, a2 white circle, b2 white circle, c2 white circle, d2 white circle, e2 white circle, f2 white circle, g2 white circle, h2 white circle, a1 white circle, b1 white circle, c1 white circle, d1 white circle, e1 white circle, f1 white circle, g1 white circle, h1 white circle

Vigman's draughts starting position
