= Ion Dosca =

Moldavian Brazilian draughts player

Ion Dosca OR
Personal information
- Nationality: Moldovan
- Born: January 2, 1955 (age 71) Bucovăţ, Moldavian SSR, Soviet Union

Sport
- Sport: Draughts
- Team: Moldova

Achievements and titles
- National finals: USSR championships, Russian checkers: 1991 champion Moldova championships, Russian checkers: 15 times champion U.S. championships, pool checkers: 2000 champion
Medal record
Representing Moldova
Draughts
World Mind Sports Games
Silver medal – second place	2008 Beijing	Brazilian draughts
World Draughts-64 championships
Gold medal – first place	São Caetano do Sul 1999	Brazilian draughts

Ion Dosca (born 2 January 1955) is a Moldovan Brazilian draughts player, international grandmaster since 1996 and world champion in 1999. Dosca also plays other variants of draughts, such as Russian checkers and pool checkers and won numerous national championships in both variants.

== Sports career ==
Ion Dosca played in Soviet junior competitions from the age of 12. At 15, he won the Moldavian SSR youth championships in Russian checkers. In the early 1970s Dosca made first real successes on the All-Union level, winning the silver medal at the All-Union junior Trade Unions Sports Society championships in 1971 and taking the title at the same competition in the next year. In 1974 Dosca won his first Moldavian senior title and received a Master of Sport rank. In 1980 and 1990 Dosca won the USSR Cup in Russian checkers, and in 1991 he shared the first place in the last Soviet championships in Russian checkers.

Ion Dosca made significant successes on the international level. In addition to winning the World championships in Brazilian draughts in 1999, he also won a silver medal (in 1996) and three bronze medals (in 1993, 2004 and 2007) at these championships. In 2008 at the World Mind Sports Games in Beijing he was leading after the Swiss part of the Brazilian draughts tournament and eventually won the silver medal, losing in the final to the Russia's representative Oleg Dashkov.

Ion Dosca is 15 times national champion of Moldova in Russian checkers, and he also won the American Pool Checkers Association championships in 2000.

Dosca was awarded the Order of Labour Glory for his victory in the 1999 world championships and was nominated by the local media for the Sports person of the year title.

== Record in the main international tournaments in Brazilian draughts ==
Year	Level	Location	Tournament/match	Result	Place
1993	WC	(Brazil) Águas de Lindóia	Tournament	21/36	3—4
1996	WC	(Brazil) Belo Horizonte	Tournament	20/30	2
1997	WC	(Moldova) Chişinău	Match with (Russia) A. Schwarzman	+0=9-3	2
1999	WC	(Brazil) São Caetano do Sul	Tournament	18/26	1
2004	WC	(Brazil) Ubatuba	Tournament	10/18	3
2007	WC	(Germany) Saarbrücken	Tournament	15/22	3
2008	WMSG	(China) Beijing	Tournament (Swiss + play-off)	+4=3-0	2
2008	WC	(Brazil) Recife	Tournament (Swiss + play-off)	8/14	9—12
