= Salou Open =

Draughts tournament

The Salou Open is a yearly international draughts tournament. The tournament has been organized since 1998 in the second half of May in Salou, Spain.

== Winners ==
Year	Gold	Silver	Bronze
1998	(Belarus) Anatoli Gantvarg	(Netherlands) Andrew Tjon a Ong	(Netherlands) Wim Vrijland
1999	(Belarus) Evgeni Vatutin	(United States) Iser Koeperman	(Netherlands) Klaas Bor
2000	(Belarus) Anatoli Gantvarg	(Netherlands) Nina Hoekman	(Netherlands) Eric van Dusseldorp
2001	(Belarus) Anatoli Gantvarg	(Russia) Anatoli Chulkov	(Netherlands) Henk Kalk
2002	(Russia) Alexander Schwarzman	(Latvia) Guntis Valneris	(Russia) Alexei Chizhov
2003	(Latvia) Guntis Valneris	(Netherlands) Kees Thijssen, (Russia) Sergei Kalinov and (Netherlands) Nina Hoekman	
2004	(Netherlands) Kees Thijssen	(Russia) Murodoullo Amrillaev	(Russia) Vladimir Milshin
2005	(Latvia) Guntis Valneris	(Latvia) Viesturs Tomass	(Belarus) Anatoli Gantvarg
2006	(Netherlands) Kees Thijssen	(Ukraine) Yuri Anikeev	(Ukraine) Yuriy Lagoda
2007	(Russia) Alexander Getmanski	(Belarus) Anatoli Gantvarg	(Russia) Rinat Ishimbaev
2008	(Netherlands) Martin Dolfing	(Latvia) Guntis Valneris	(Ukraine) Yuri Anikeev
2009	(Latvia) Guntis Valneris	(Belarus) Anatoli Gantvarg	(Netherlands) Alexander Baljakin
2010	(Netherlands) Alexander Baljakin	(Russia) Murodoullo Amrillaev	(Belarus) Anatoli Gantvarg
2011	(Latvia) Guntis Valneris	(Netherlands) Alexander Baljakin	(Russia) Nikolai Gulyaev
2012	(Netherlands) Roel Boomstra	(Russia) Alexander Georgiev	(Latvia) Guntis Valneris
2013	(Russia) Gavril Kolesov	(Belarus) Anatoli Gantvarg	(Russia) Murodoullo Amrillaev
2014	(Russia) Alexander Georgiev	(Belarus) Anatoli Gantvarg	(Latvia) Guntis Valneris
2015	(Netherlands) Jan Groenendijk	(Netherlands) Roel Boomstra	(Russia) Alexander Georgiev
2016	(Russia) Alexander Georgiev	(Russia) Ainur Shaibakov	(Belarus) Evgeni Vatutin
2017	(Russia) Alexander Georgiev	(Russia) Ivan Trofimov	(Ukraine) Artem Ivanov
2018	(Russia) Alexander Georgiev	(Belarus) Anatoli Gantvarg	(Russia) Alexander Schwarzman
2019	(Belarus) Anatoli Gantvarg	(Russia) Alexander Schwarzman	(Russia) Alexander Georgiev
2022	FMJD Alexander Schwarzman	(Lithuania) Aleksej Domchev	(Netherlands) Hein Meijer
2023	FMJD Anatoli Gantvarg	(Israel) Alexander Schwarzman	(Netherlands) Hein Meijer
2024	(Israel) Alexander Schwarzman	(Ukraine) Yuri Anikeev	(Ukraine) Yuri Lagoda
2025	(Israel) Alexander Schwarzman	(Netherlands) Matheo Boxum	(Ukraine) Viktoriya Motrichko
2026	(Netherlands) Martijn Van Ijzendoorn	(Netherlands) Jan Groenendijk	(Netherlands) Jitse Slump
