= Veronika Kalmus =

Estonian sociologist and draughts champion

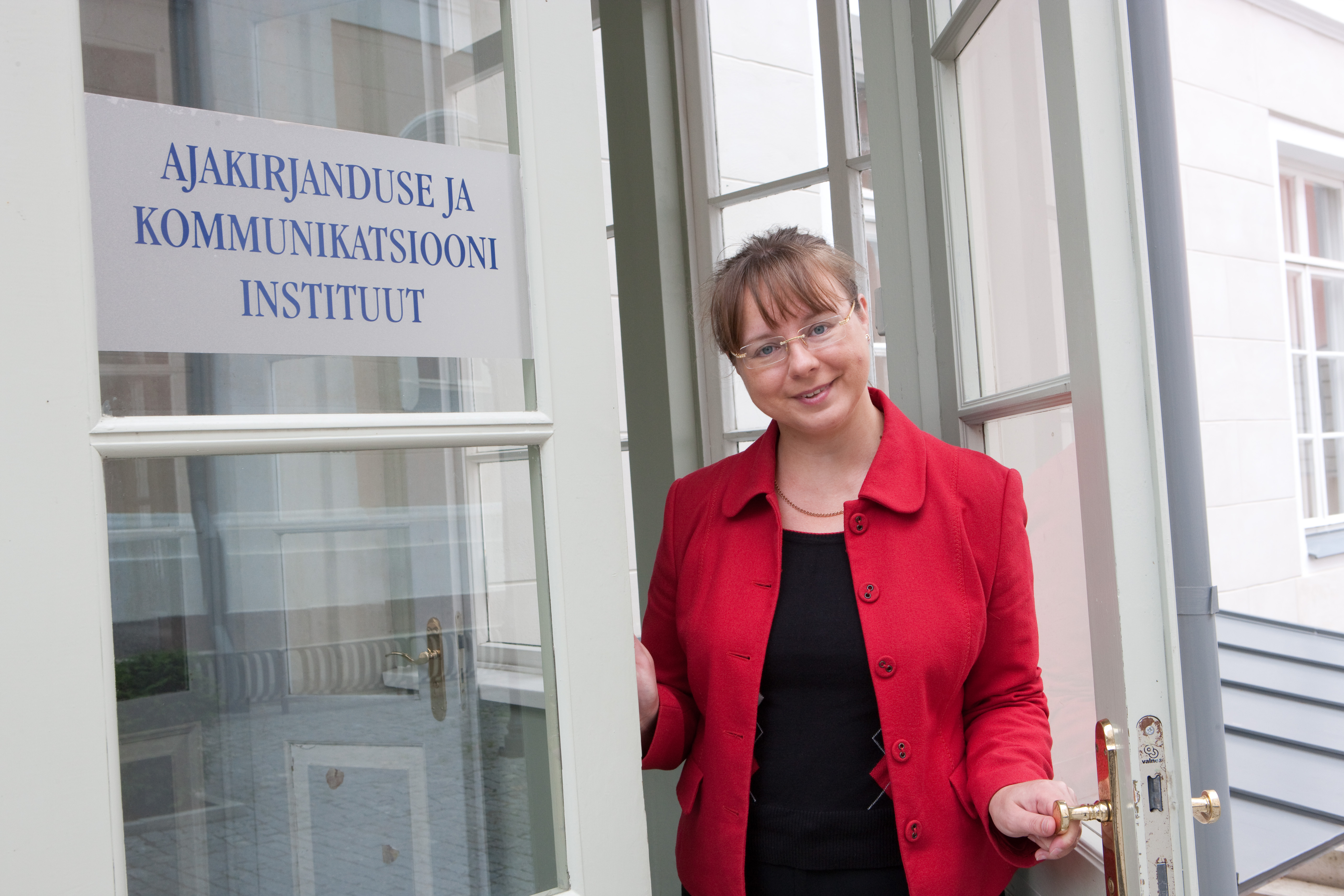
- Born: Veronika Teder; 8 June 1973 (age 53); Elva, Estonia
- Education: University of Tartu; University of Oslo
- Scientific career
- Fields: Sociologist
- Workplaces: University of Tartu

Veronika Kalmus (née Veronika Teder; born 8 June 1973) is an Estonian sociologist and competitive draughts player. She is a professor of sociology at the University of Tartu. She specializes in trends in societal attitudes, particularly in Estonia, and the uses of educational media. She has won eight gold medals in national competitions of Russian draughts.

== Education ==
Kalmus attended the University of Tartu, where she graduated with a bachelor's degree in sociology in 1995. She continued to study sociology at the University of Tartu, obtaining a master's degree in sociology in 1998, and also in 1998 earned a master's degree in media studies from the University of Oslo. Her master's degree at the University of Tartu was supervised by Marju Lauristin and Wenche Vagle, and her thesis was titled Estonian ABC-Books 1900–1997: Reflections of Cultural and Ideological Changes.

In 2003, Kalmus completed a doctorate in sociology at the University of Tartu. Lauristin also supervised her doctoral dissertation, which was called School Textbooks in the Field of Socialization.

== Academic career ==
In 1999, Kalmus became a professor of media studies at the University of Tartu. In 2015 she joined the faculty of sociology there.

Kalmus specializes in methods of education and in societal attitudes, particularly trends in xenophobia and tolerance. She studies these trends using large-scale surveys, text analyses, and media analysis.

In 2008, Kalmus received the Young Scientist Award (et) from the Cultural Foundation of the President of the Republic (et). The award was presented by Estonian President Toomas Hendrik Ilves for her work on value formation and the sociological role of the internet. This represented the first time that a social scientist won this national research award. In 2017, Kalmus received the Badge of Honor of the University of Tartu. In 2019, she was elected to Academia Europaea.

Kalmus has served as the Vice President of the Estonian Association of Sociologists.

== Draughts ==
In 1989, Kalmus won second place in the Russian Cup in Russian Checkers. She then won eight gold medals in national competitions of Russian checkers: she won tournaments in 1989, 1990, 1992, 1993, 1995, 1997, 1999, and 2000. She also won three gold medals in blitz checkers, in 1993, 1994, and 2003, three consecutive gold medals in team competitions from 2000 to 2002, and one gold medal in Brazilian draughts in 1992.

Kalmus contributed research to the book Eesti kabemängu ajaloost (The History of Estonian Checkers). In 1990 and again in 1992 she was named the best female athlete in Tartu County.
