= 2022 World Draughts Championship match =

Draughts match between Alexander Schwartzman and Roel Boomstra

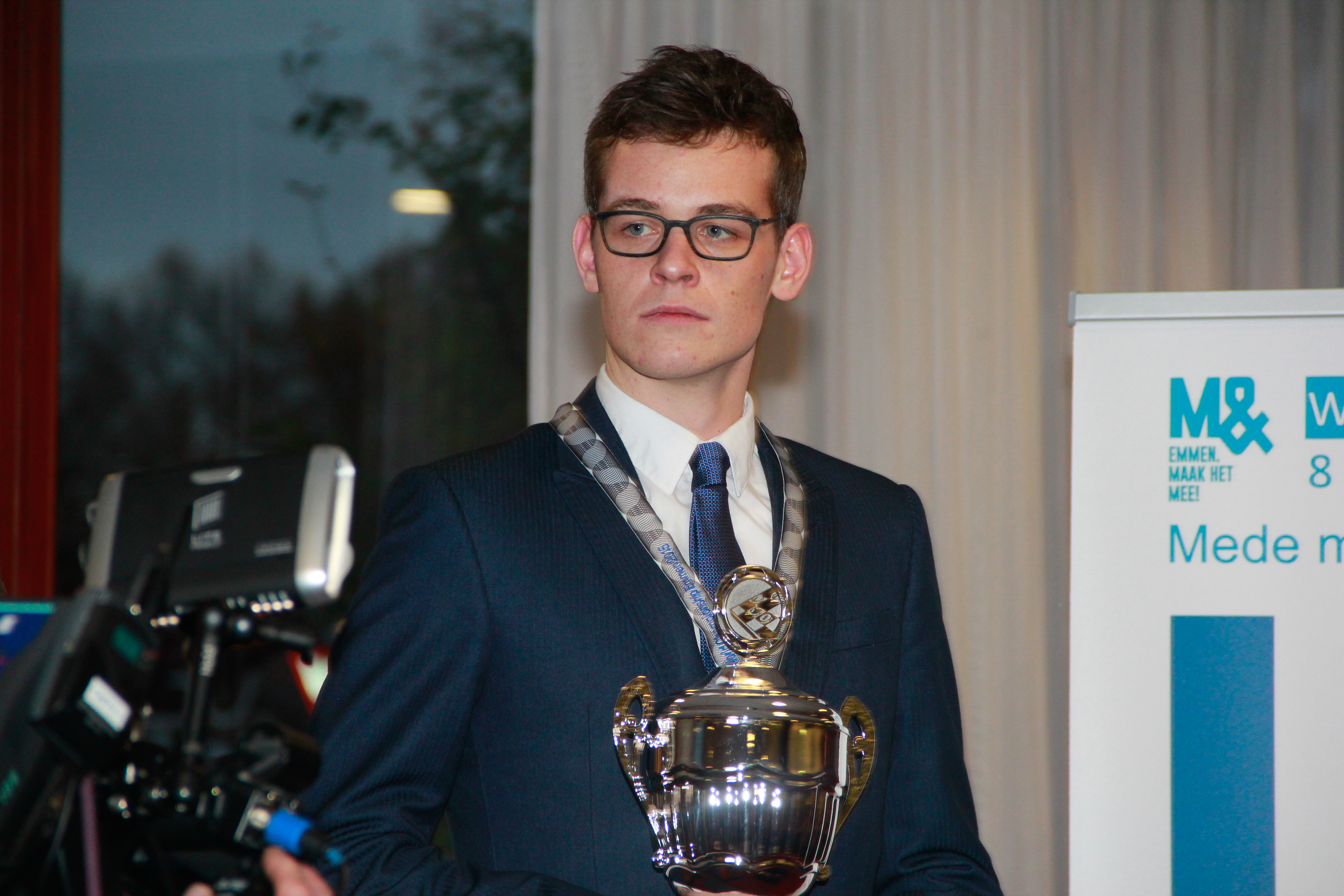
- 2022 World Draughts Champion Roel Boomstra

Tournament information
- Location: Eindhoven, Netherlands
- Dates: 5 January–20 January
- Administrator: FMJD
- Tournament format: Match
- Venue: High Tech Campus Eindhoven

Final positions
- Champion: Roel Boomstra

The 2022 World Draughts Championship match was held from 5 to 20 January, 2022 at the High Tech Campus Eindhoven in Eindhoven, Netherlands. It was held under the auspices of the International Draughts Federation (FMJD) and played between the reigning 2021 world champion, Alexander Schwartzman, and the 2018 world champion, Roel Boomstra.

Boomstra won the match to capture his third world championship title.

== Rules and regulations ==
The match consisted of 12 games, played with a time control of 80 minutes plus a 1-minute increment per move. The player with the highest score won the world title if he won at least three games. If not, tie-break games were played until one player achieved a third overall win.

The first tie-break was 3 rapid games, 20 minutes plus a 10-second increment per move. The second tie-break was 3 blitz games, 10 minutes plus a 5-second increment per move. The third tie-break was Superblitz (limited time for an unlimited number of games until the first victory), 10 minutes plus a 2-second increment per move.

Preliminary tie-breaking games were to be played if the first six games ended in a draw. These tie-break games were played until the first victory.

== Schedule ==
| Date | Local time | Event |
|---|---|---|
| 5 January | 11:00 | Opening day & Round 1 |
| 6 January | 11:00 | Round 2 |
| 7 January | 11:00 | Round 3 |
| 8 January | N/A | Rest day |
| 9 January | 11:00 | Round 4 |
| 10 January | 11:00 | Round 5 |
| 11 January | 11:00 | Round 6 |
| 12 January | 11:00 | Tie-break |
| 13 January | 11:00 | Round 7 |
| 14 January | 11:00 | Round 8 |
| 15 January | 11:00 | Round 9 |
| 16 January | N/A | Rest day (tie-break was not played) |
| 17 January | 11:00 | Round 10 |
| 18 January | 11:00 | Round 11 |
| 19 January | 11:00 | Round 12 |
| 20 January | 11:00 | Tie-break & Award ceremony |

== Results ==
=== Regular games ===
| Player | Rating | 1 | 2 | 3 | 4 | 5 | 6 | TB1 | 7 | 8 | 9 | 10 | 11 | 12 | TB2 | Points | Victories |
|---|---|---|---|---|---|---|---|---|---|---|---|---|---|---|---|---|---|
| (Netherlands) Roel Boomstra | 2419 | 1 | 1 | 1 | 1 | 1 | 1 | 2 | 1 | 2 | 1 | 1 | 1 | 1 | 2 | 17 | 3 |
| (Russia) Alexander Schwartzman | 2400 | 1 | 1 | 1 | 1 | 1 | 1 | 0 | 1 | 0 | 1 | 1 | 1 | 1 | 0 | 11 | 0 |

=== First tie-break ===
| Player | Rating rapid/blitz | Rapid game 1 | Rapid game 2 | Rapid game 3 | Blitz game 1 | Blitz game 2 | Blitz game 3 | Superblitz game 1 | Points | Victories |
|---|---|---|---|---|---|---|---|---|---|---|
| (Netherlands) Roel Boomstra | 2443 | 1 | 1 | 1 | 1 | 1 | 1 | 2 | 8 | 1 |
| (Russia) Alexander Schwartzman | 2453 | 1 | 1 | 1 | 1 | 1 | 1 | 0 | 6 | 0 |

=== Second tie-break ===
| Player | Rating rapid/blitz | Rapid game 1 | Rapid game 2 | Rapid game 3 | Blitz game 1 | Blitz game 2 | Blitz game 3 | Superblitz game 1 | Points | Victories |
|---|---|---|---|---|---|---|---|---|---|---|
| (Netherlands) Roel Boomstra | 2443 | 1 | 1 | 2 | – | – | – | – | 4 | 1 |
| (Russia) Alexander Schwartzman | 2453 | 1 | 1 | 0 | – | – | – | – | 2 | 0 |

== See also ==
- Draughts World Championship
