= Russian Draughts Championship =

The Russian Draughts Championship is the Russian championship in international draughts.

== History ==
The inaugural championship was held in Pyatigorsk in 1992. It has taken place annually since then, except in 2001. Originally conducted as a round-robin tournament, the format switched to the Swiss system in 2013. Rapid and blitz events have been held alongside the main championship since 1998.

== Classic ==
Number	Year	Host	Gold	Silver	Bronze
1	1992	Pyatigorsk	Ivan Kostionov; Sergei Kalinov	------	Konstantin Leontiev; Vladimir Logunov
2	1993	Elektrostal	Alexander Schwarzman	Ivan Kostionov	Michail Galashov
3	1994	Tula	Andrei Kalmakov; Alexander Georgiev	------	Yuriy Chertok
4	1995	Orsk	Andrei Kalmakov; Alexander Georgiev	------	Michail Galashov
5	1996	Izhevsk	Alexander Schwarzman	Andrei Kalmakov	Alexander Georgiev
6	1997	Tula	Alexander Georgiev	Alexander Getmanski	Murodoullo Amrillaev
7	1998	Ishimbay	Alexander Getmanski	Alexander Georgiev	Murodoullo Amrillaev
8	1999	Ishimbay	Alexander Getmanski	Alexander Georgiev	Vladimir Milshin
9	2000	Krasnokamsk	Alexander Georgiev	Andrei Kalmakov	Vladimir Milshin
	2001*				
10	2002	Ufa	Alexander Georgiev	Alexei Chizhov	Alexander Schwarzman
11	2003	Ufa	Alexander Schwarzman	Alexander Georgiev	Alexander Getmanski
12	2004	Ufa	Alexander Schwarzman	Alexander Georgiev	Alexander Getmanski
13	2005	Ishimbay	Alexander Georgiev	Alexander Getmanski	Alexander Schwarzman
14	2006	Ufa	Alexander Georgiev	Murodoullo Amrillaev	Alexander Getmanski
15	2007	Kolontaevo	Alexander Georgiev	Alexander Schwarzman	Alexander Getmanski
16	2008	Kolontaevo	Alexander Schwarzman	Alexander Georgiev	Murodoullo Amrillaev
17	2009	Stupino	Alexander Georgiev	Alexander Getmanski	Andrei Kalmakov
18	2010	Kolontaevo	Alexander Georgiev	Murodoullo Amrillaev	Alexander Schwarzman
19	2011	Ufa	Alexander Georgiev	Alexander Getmanski	Nikolai Gulyaev
20*	2012	Suzdal; Ishimbay	Murodoullo Amrillaev; Alexander Georgiev	Vladimir Milshin; Alexei Chizhov	Andrei Kalmakov; Alexander Getmanski
21	2013	Suzdal	Ainur Shaibakov	Murodoullo Amrillaev	Alexander Georgiev
22	2014	Tutaev	Nicolay Germogenov	Alexander Schwarzman	Andrei Kalmakov
23	2015	Loo	Alexander Getmanski	Alexander Schwarzman	Nicolay Germogenov
24	2016	Loo	Alexei Chizhov	Andrei Kalmakov	Ivan Trofimov
25	2017	Loo	Maxim Milshin	Alexander Getmanski	Andrei Kalmakov
26	2018	Golubitskaya	Nikolai Gulyaev	Ivan Trofimov	Nicolay Germogenov
27	2019	Pokrovskoye	Alexander Georgiev	Nicolay Germogenov	Ivan Trofimov
28	2020	Pokrovskoye	Vladimir Milshin	Alexander Getmanski	Ilia Deriglazov
29	2021	Loo	Ivan Trofimov	Alexander Getmanski	Alexander Georgiev
30	2022	Pokrovskoye	Sergey Belosheev	Alexander Getmanski	Vyacheslav Varlamov
31	2023	Pokrovskoye	Alexander Georgiev	Alexander Getmanski	Sergey Belosheev
32	2024	Pokrovskoye	Alexander Georgiev	Alexander Getmanski	Prokopiy Govorov
33	2025	Ufa	Ainur Shaibakov	Alexander Georgiev	Marcel Sharafutdinov
34	2026	Pokrovskoye	Alexander Georgiev	Alexander Getmanski	Murodoullo Amrillaev

* In 2012 two tournaments were held called the Russian Championship, one in Suzdal, the other in Ishimbay.
