= USSR Russian Draughts Championship =

USSR Russian Draughts Championship is a USSR championship in Russian draughts.

== History ==
The annual draughts competition was held in the USSR from 1924 to 1991. The first official championship was held in 1924 in Moscow. The last championship was held in 1991 in connection with the disintegration of the USSR. The championships were held in a round robin system. The first and second championships were held without time control and without recording the games, which became mandatory starting from the third championship. The regulation gave 1 hour for 15 moves. It lasted until 1972.

Since 1952, the championship began to be held with quarterfinals, semi-finals and finals. In 1961, for the first time, the national championship final was held on the Swiss system. In 1969, the Swiss system semi-final was held with 70 athletes, in the final 10 checkers played in a two-round robin system. In 1972, the system of micro-matches, proposed by the Moscow master Vladimir Gagarin, was used for the first time, designed to increase the number of productive games. According to this system, the opponents had to determine the result of the game between them not in one game, but in two: one game had to be played with white, and the second with black, moreover, for the victory in a micro-match (with a score of 2-0 or 1.5-0.5) one point was given, half a point was given for a draw, 0 points for a defeat. In 1972, the semi-finals were played in a round robin system, in the finals in a round robin system, for the first time, micro-matches of two games with a shortened time control were played: 1 hour 10 minutes for the first 35 moves and then 30 minutes for every 15 moves. Since this year, the finals have been played using the micromatch system. In 1973, the selection for the finals was based on the results of the championships of sports societies, the finals were held according to the Swiss system with a shorter time control. At the 1984 championship, the draw for the mandatory first moves was used for the first time. Since this year, the finals have been held in two stages. At the first stage, the participants of the second stage were selected. At the second stage, the champion and prize-winners were determined.

The last championship was held in 1991 in connection with the disintegration of the USSR, total 51 championships were held. This competition was the largest competition in Russian draughts, only at 1993 took place first Draughts-64 World Championship in Russian draughts.

== Results ==
Number	Year	Host	Gold	Silver	Bronze
1	1924	Moscow	Vasiliy Medkov	Nikolay Kukuev	Sergey Sokolov
2	1925	Moscow	Vasiliy Medkov	Nikolay Kukuev	Michael Ivanov
3 + match	1927	Moscow	Vladimir Bakumenko	Sergey Sokolov	Leonid Potapov
match	1928	Moscow	Vasiliy Medkov — Vladimir Bakumenko (+ 6, - 4, = 10)		
4	1930	Moscow	Dmitriy Shebedev	Igor Timkovskiy	Semyon Korhov; Vladimir Romanov
5	1934 (March)	Moscow	Boris Blinder; Semyon Natov	--------	Vladimir Romanov; Igor Timkovskiy
6	1934 (December)	Leningrad	Igor Timkovskiy	Vasiliy Sokov	Leonid Potapov
7	1938	Kyiv	Vasiliy Sokov	Izrail Blitshtein; Aleksander Verete; Leonid Potapov; Leon Ramm; Igor Timkovskiy; Nikolay Shutilkin	--------
8	1945	Moscow	Iser Kuperman	Boris Blinder	Aleksander Verete; Dmitriy Korshunov
9 + match	1946/47	Leningrad + Moscow	Iser Kuperman	Marat Kogan	Vladimir Romanov; Zinoviy Tsirik
10	1947/48	Moscow	Iser Kuperman	Boris Blinder; Marat Kogan	-------
11	1949	Moscow	Marat Kogan	Zinoviy Tsirik	Nikolay Kosogov
12	1950	Kyiv	Iser Kuperman	Vladimir Kaplan	Marat Kogan
13	1951	Kharkiv	Zinoviy Tsirik	Boris Blinder; Marat Kogan	-------
14	1952	Leningrad	Boris Blinder	Marat Kogan	Zinoviy Tsirik
15	1953	Minsk	Yuriy Mitiagin	Vladimir Romanov; Vladimir Kaplan	-------
16	1954	Chișinău	Valentin Abaulin	Iser Kuperman	Nikolay Sretenskiy; Vladimir Kaplan; Eugeniy Tiunev
17	1955	Baku	Zinoviy Tsirik	Petr Sviatoy; Valentin Abaulin	--------
18 + match	1957/58	Kharkiv + Poltava	Zinoviy Tsirik; Boris Blinder	--------	Dmitriy Roskov
19 + доп.match	1959	Minsk + Orekhovo-Zuyevo	Zinoviy Tsirik	Boris Blinder	Vyacheslav Shchyogolev
20 + match	1960	Tula + Kyiv	Zinoviy Tsirik; Arkadiy Plakkhin	--------	Veniamin Gorodetskiy
21	1961	Taganrog	Veniamin Gorodetskiy	Valentin Abaulin	Teodor Shmulian
22 + match	1962	Kharkiv + Orekhovo-Zuyevo	Valentin Abaulin	Veniamin Gorodetskiy	Arkadiy Plakkhin
23	1963	Liepāja	Arkadiy Plakkhin	Vladimir Golosuev	Valentin Abaulin
24	1964	Smolensk	Zinoviy Tsirik	Valentin Abaulin; Viktor Petrov; Viktor Litvinovich	-------
25	1965	Liepāja	Viktor Litvinovich	Valentin Abaulin	Nikolay Abatsiev
26	1966	Grozny	Vitaliy Gabrielian	Yuriy Arustamov	Viktor Litvinovich
27	1967	Almaty	Viktor Litvinovich	Nikolay Abatsiev	Arkadiy Plakkhin
28	1968	Baku	Nikolay Abatsiev	Vitaliy Gabrielian	Eugeniy Tiunev; Nikolay Kononov
29	1969	Chișinău	Vitaliy Gabrielian	Nikolay Abatsiev	Yuriy Arustamov
30	1970	Liepāja	Yuriy Arustamov	Vladimir Vigman	Vitaliy Gabrielian; Eduard Tsukernik
31	1971	Poti	Viktor Litvinovich	Vitaliy Gabrielian	Виктор Чечиков
32	1972	Orenburg	Yuriy Kustarev; Pavel Milovidov; Arkadiy Plakkhin	--------	--------
33	1973	Voroshilovgrad	Vitaliy Gabrielian	Eduard Tsukernik	Nikolay Abatsiev
34	1974	Kaliningrad	Arkadiy Plakkhin	Markiel Fazylov	Eugeniy Kukleev
35	1975	Simferopol	Elshad Mursalov; Boris Simonian	--------	Yuriy Arustamov
36	1976	Yalta	Vladimir Vigman	Ayvar Voitseshchuk	Elshad Mursalov
37	1977	Bender	Vladimir Vigman; Vitaliy Gabrielian	--------	Aleksander Kandaurov
38	1978	Vilnius	Vladimir Vigman	Vitaliy Gabrielian	Michael Rahunov
39	1979	Baku	Viktor Litvinovich	Michael Rahunov	Aleksey Ustinov
40	1980	Grodno	Michael Rahunov; Markiel Fazylov	--------	Viktor Litvinovich
41	1981	Kyiv	Markiel Fazylov	Boris Simonian	Viktor Litvinovich
42	1982	Chișinău	Aleksander Kandaurov	Levon Sayadian	Vitaliy Gabrielian
43	1983	Tallinn	Levon Sayadian	Vitaliy Gabrielian	Arkadiy Plakkhin
44	1984	Moscow	Alexander Schwarzman	Michael Rahunov	Nikolay Abatsiev
45	1985	Tashkent	Sergey Ovechkin; Arunas Norvaisas	--------	Vitaliy Gabrielian
46	1986	Tallinn	Alexander Schwarzman	Vitaliy Gabrielian	Aleksander Kandaurov
47	1987	Samarkand	Aleksander Kandaurov	Aleksey Konstantinov	Arunas Norvaisas
48	1988	Baku	Michael Rahunov; Nikolay Abatsiev	--------	Arunas Norvaisas
49	1989	Pinsk	Aleksander Kandaurov; Andrey Ivanov	--------	Michael Rahunov
50	1990	Mariupol	Markiel Fazylov; Yuriy Korolev	--------	
51	1991	Chișinău	Ion Dosca; Aleksander Kandaurov	--------	Yuriy Korolev

== Literature ==
- XIV и XV первенства СССР по шашкам. А. И. Дрябезгов, А. М. Сидлин. — М. : Физкультура и спорт, 1955. — 352 с.
- Методическое пособие СЛШИ. «От Медкова до Иванова». Авторы Ю.А. Арустамов, В.М. Высоцкий, С.Н. Горбачёв. 1990.
- Журнал «Шашки» 1973 №12, с.11.
