= Nikolay Struchkov =

Russian draughts player

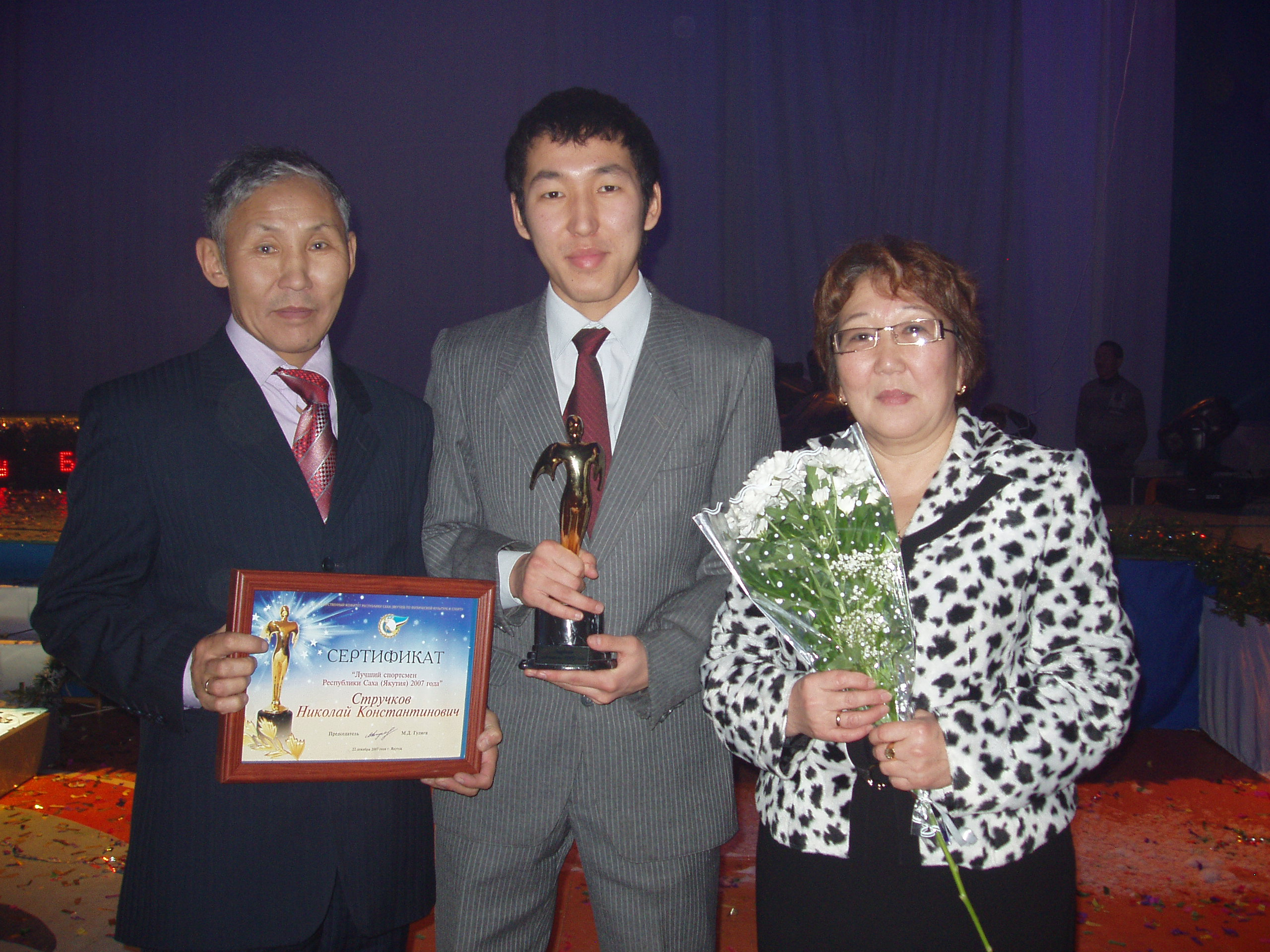
Nicolay Struchkov with his father and mother

Nikolay Konstantinovich Struchkov (Russian: Николай Константинович Стручков; born 6 January 1986, in Pokrovsk, Sakha Republic, Soviet Union) is a Russian draughts player (Russian, Brazilian draughts and International draughts), four time world champion in draughts-64. International grandmaster (GMI) since 2007. Struchkov started playing draughts at the school where draughts were as a lesson. He graduated from the Faculty of Economics Peoples' Friendship University of Russia (Moscow) in 2010.

== Sport achievements ==
- World champion (Brazilian and Russian draughts) 2006, 2007, 2013, 2014, 2024.
- Third place in European championship (Brazilian and Russian draughts) 2010.
- Russian national champion (Russian draughts) 2013.
