= Gavril Kolesov =

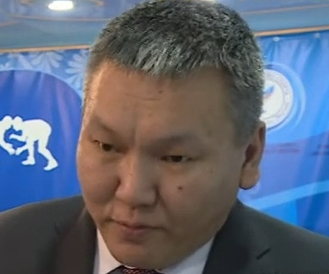
Gavril Kolesov in November 2017

Gavril Kolesov (Russian: Гаврил Гаврильевич Колесов, born 7 September 1979, in Dyabyla, Yakut Autonomous Soviet Socialist Republic, Soviet Union) is Russian draughts player (Russian, Brazilian and International draughts), seven time world champion in draughts-64. International grandmaster (GMI) since 1996. He graduated North-Eastern Federal University in 2001.

== Sport achievements ==
- World champion (Brazilian and Russian draughts) 1996, 1997, 2000, 2002, 2004, 2006, 2012.
- European champion (Brazilian and Russian draughts) 2010 (rapid and blitz).
- Russian national champion (Russian draughts) 2010 and 2012.
- Winner of Salou Open Tournament 2013.
