= Aleksander Kandaurov =

Russian draughts player (born 1956)

Aleksander Kandaurov (Russian: Александр Борисович Кандауров, born 17 January 1956, in Moscow, Soviet Union) is a Russian draughts player (Russian and Brazilian draughts) who has been the first world champion in draughts-64 (Brazilian version) in 1985, four-time champion USSR in Russian draughts (1982, 1987, 1989, 1991). He also played in International draughts and had the title of 'International grandmaster' (GMI) since 1986.
