= Lourival Mendes França =

Brazilian draughts player

Lourival Mendes França (died 18 August 2012) was a Brazilian draughts player (Brazilian draughts and International draughts), world champion in draughts-64 (1993). International grandmaster (GMI) in draughts-64, International master (MI) in International draughts.

== Sport achievements ==
- World champion (Brazilian draughts) 1993.
- Brazilian national champion (Brazilian draughts) (1969, 1970, 1991).
- Played in Panamerican championship (International draughts), best result fourth place in 1994.
- Played in 1982 World draughts championship (International draughts) - 14 place.
