= Sergey Belosheev =

Russian draughts player (born 1986)

Personal information
- Native name: Сергей Александрович Белошеев
- Born: April 27, 1986 (age 40) Yevpatoria, Ukrainian SSR, USSR

Sport
- Sport: Draughts
- Team: Russia
Medal record
Representing Russia
Draughts
World Draughts-64 championships
Gold medal – first place	Chelyabinsk 2009	Russian draughts
Gold medal – first place	St.Petersburg 2015	Russian draughts
Silver medal – second place	Ubatuba 2004	Brazilian draughts
Silver medal – second place	Aktobe 2006	Russian draughts
Silver medal – second place	St.Petersburg 2011	Russian draughts
Bronze medal – third place	Recife 2008	Brazilian draughts
Bronze medal – third place	Izmir 2018	Brazilian draughts
European Draughts-64 championships
Silver medal – second place	St.Petersburg 2014	Russian draughts

Sergey Belosheev (Russian: Сергей Александрович Белошеев, born April 27, 1986) is a Russian draughts player (Russian, Brazilian and International draughts), two time world champion in draughts-64, seven time champion of Ukraine at Russian draughts (2006-2010, 2012, 2013). International grandmaster (GMI) since 2005. He graduated Tavrida National V.I. Vernadsky University.

== Sport achievements ==
World champion (Brazilian and Russian draughts)

- 1st place 2009, 2015
- 2nd place 2004, 2006, 2011
- 3 place 2008 and 2018.

European champion (Brazilian and Russian draughts)

- 2nd place 2014

Blits

- 1st place 2012
- 2nd place 2010 and 2016

Rapid

- 2nd place 2010 and 2016
- 3 place 2010 (rapid).

Ukrainian national champion (Russian draughts) 1st place (2006-2010, 2012, 2013), 3 place 2004.

Russian national champion (Russian draughts) - 2nd place (2015, 2017), 3 place 2016.

Thailand Open Jomtien 2018 (International draughts) - 1st place.
