= World Draughts-64 Championship =

The Draughts-64 World Championship is the world championship for Brazilian and Russian draughts.

== History ==
The championship has been organized by the World Draughts Federation (FMJD) since 1985, the last few championship organized by the International Draughts Federation (IDF). The first championship was in Brazilian draughts. In 1993 the first championship in Russian draughts was held. Since 1993 took place Draughts-64 World Championship in blitz, since 1998 in rapid.

== Classic ==
Year	Type	Location	Gold	Silver	Bronze
1985	Brazilian	(Italy) Galatina	(Soviet Union) Aleksander Kandaurov	(Soviet Union) Vladimir Vigman	(Brazil) Duglas Diniz
1987	Brazilian	(Brazil) San-Lorenzo	(Soviet Union) Alexander Schwarzman	(Soviet Union) Vladimir Vigman	(Soviet Union) Rostislav Leschinsky
1989	Brazilian	(Brazil) San-Lorenzo	(Soviet Union) Alexander Schwarzman	(Soviet Union) Vladimir Vigman	(Soviet Union) Michail Rakhunov
1993	Brazilian	(Brazil) Águas de Lindóia	(Russia) Alexander Schwarzman (Brazil) Lourival Mendes França (Moldova) Ion Dosca (United States) Iser Kuperman		
1993	Russian	(Belarus) Pinsk	(Tajikistan) Murodoullo Amrillaev	(Russia) Yuri Korolev	(Belarus) Andrei Valyuk
1994	Russian	(Russia) Dzerzinsk	(Belarus) Arkady Plakhin	(Russia) Victor Tereschenko	(Russia) Michail Fedorov
1996	Brazilian	(Brazil) Belo Horizonte	(Russia) Alexander Schwarzman	(Moldova) Ion Dosca	(Latvia) Gennady Shapiro
1996	Russian	(Uzbekistan) Samarkand	(Russia) Gavril Kolesov	(Uzbekistan) Nicolay Mischansky	(Russia) Murodoullo Amrillaev
1997	Match (Russian)	(Belarus) Minsk	(Russia) Gavril Kolesov	(Belarus) Arkady Plakhin	match result: 2–0
1997	Match (Brazilian)	(Moldova) Kishinev	(Russia) Alexander Schwarzman	(Moldova) Ion Dosca	match result: 15–9
1997	Brazilian	(Ukraine) Rovno	(Belarus) Andrey Valyuk	(Uzbekistan) Markiel Fazilov	(Estonia) Arno Uutma
1998	Russian	(Ukraine) Odesa	(Ukraine) Valery Grebenkin	(Belarus) Andrey Valyuk	(Russia) Sergey Bonadikov
1999	Brazilian	(Brazil) São Caetano do Sul	(Moldova) Ion Dosca	(Ukraine) Igor Makarenkov	(Belarus) Vitaly Gabrielyan
2000	Russian	(Ukraine) Odesa	(Russia) Gavril Kolesov	(Ukraine) Valery Grebenkin	(Belarus) Arkady Plakhin
2002	Brazilian	(Brazil) São Paulo	(Russia) Gavril Kolesov	(Lithuania) Andrus Kybartas	(Ukraine) Yuri Anikeev
2003	Russian	(Ukraine) Simferopol	(Russia) Yuri Korolev	(Russia) Gavril Kolesov	(Russia) Alexander Getmanski
2004	Match (Russian)	(Russia) Mirny	(Russia) Gavril Kolesov	(Russia) Yuri Korolev	match result: 2–0
2004	Brazilian	(Brazil) Ubatuba	(Ukraine) Yuri Anikeev	(Ukraine) Sergey Belosheev	(Moldova) Ion Dosca
2005	Russian	(Ukraine) Eupatoria	(Belarus) Andrey Valyuk	(Russia) Dmitry Tsinman	(Russia) Murodoullo Amrillaev
2006	Match (Russian)	(Russia) Yakutsk	(Russia) Gavril Kolesov	(Belarus) Andrey Valyuk	match result: 2–0
2006	Russian	(Kazakhstan) Aktobe	(Russia) Nicolay Struchkov	(Ukraine) Sergey Belosheev	(Ukraine) Valery Grebenkin
2007	Brazilian	(Germany) Saarbrücken	(Russia) Nicolay Struchkov	(Russia) Oleg Dashkov	(Moldova) Ion Dosca
2008	Brazilian	(Brazil) Recife	(Russia) Alexander Schwarzman	(Ukraine) Yuri Anikeev	(Ukraine) Sergey Belosheev
2009	Russian	(Russia) Chelyabinsk	(Ukraine) Sergey Belosheev	(Russia) Vladimir Egorov	(Russia) Petr Chernishev
2011	Russian	(Russia) Saint Petersburg	(Russia) Oleg Dashkov	(Ukraine) Sergey Belosheev	(Russia) Alexander Georgiev
2012	Brazilian	(France) Lille	(Russia) Gavril Kolesov	(Russia) Nicolay Germogenov	(Russia) Oleg Dashkov
2013	Russian	(Russia) Saint Petersburg	(Russia) Nicolay Struchkov	(Russia) Gavril Kolesov	(Russia) Vladimir Egorov
2014	Match (Russian)	(Russia) Saint Petersburg	(Russia) Nicolay Struchkov	(Russia) Gavril Kolesov	match result: 2–1
2015	Russian	(Russia) Saint Petersburg	(Russia) Sergey Belosheev	(Belarus) Andrey Valyuk	(Russia) Nikolay Gulyaev
2016	Brazilian, FMJD	(Brazil) São Paulo	(Russia) Alexander Georgiev	(Netherlands) Martin Dolfing	(Russia) Alexander Schwarzman
2017	Russian, IDF	(Russia) Saint Petersburg	(Belarus) Igor Mikhalchenko	(Lithuania) Andrius Kybartas	(Russia) Vladimir Egorov
2018	Brazilian, FMJD	(Turkey) İzmir	(Russia) Alexander Schwarzman	(Ukraine) Yuri Anikeev	(Russia) Sergey Belosheev
2018	Russian, FMJD	(Russia) Nizhnevartovsk	(Russia) Andrei Fedotov	(Russia) Gavril Kolesov	(Russia) Murodoullo Amrillaev
2019	Russian, IDF	(Bulgaria) Sveti Vlas	(Belarus) Igor Mikhalchenko	(Belarus) Andrey Valyuk	(Belarus) Uladzislav Valyuk
2020	Russian, FMJD	(Turkey) Kuşadası	(Russia) Andrei Fedotov	(Russia) Alexander Georgiev	(Ukraine) Yuri Anikeev
2022	Russian, IDF	(Georgia (country)) Kobuleti	NA1 Andrey Valyuk	NA1 Igor Mikhalchenko	NA2 Georgii Taranin
2024	Russian, IDF	(Russia) Moscow Oblast	NA2 Nicolay Struchkov	NA1 Igor Mikhalchenko	NA2 Damir Rysaev
2026	Russian, IDF	(Russia) Moscow Oblast	(Russia) Alexander Georgiev	(Belarus) Andrey Valyuk	(Belarus) Georgii Taranin

== Rapid ==
Year	Type	Country	Gold	Silver	Bronze
1998	Russian	(Ukraine) Odesa	(Belarus) Andrey Valyuk	(Russia) Nicolay Abatsiev	(Russia) Ivan Tokusarov
2009	Russian	(Russia) Chelyabinsk	(Ukraine) Sergey Belosheev	(Russia) Vladimir Egorov	(Russia) Dmitriy Tsinman
2011	Russian	(Russia) Saint Petersburg	(Russia) Murodoullo Amrillaev	(Ukraine) Sergey Belosheev	(Russia) Vladimir Egorov
2013	Russian	(Russia) Saint Petersburg	(Russia) Oleg Dashkov	(Ukraine) Sergey Belosheev	(Russia) Gavril Kolesov
2015	Brazilian	(Russia) Saint Petersburg	(Lithuania) Arunas Norvaisas	(Russia) Sergey Belosheev	(Russia) Andrey Fedotov
2016	Brazilian, FMJD	(Brazil) São Paulo	(Russia) Alexander Schwarzman	(Russia) Alexander Georgiev	(Netherlands) Martin Dolfing
2017	Brazilian, IDF	(Russia) Saint Petersburg	(Belarus) Igor Mikhalchenko	(Russia) Gavril Kolesov	(Russia) Sergey Belosheev
2018	Brazilian, FMJD	(Turkey) İzmir	(Russia) Sergey Belosheev	(Brazil) Vinicius Damir Pereira Da Silva	(Ukraine) Yuri Anikeev
2018	Russian, FMJD	(Russia) Nizhnevartovsk	(Russia) Sergey Belosheev	(Russia) Gavril Kolesov	(Russia) Mikhail Gorunov
2019	Brazilian, IDF	(Bulgaria) Sveti Vlas	(Belarus) Igor Mikhalchenko	(Russia) Dmitriy Tsinman	(Lithuania) Domantas Norkus
2020	Brazilian, FMJD	(Turkey) Kuşadası	(Russia) Murodoullo Amrillaev	(Russia) Sergey Belosheev	(Russia) Nikolai Gulyaev
2022	Brazilian, IDF	(Georgia (country)) Kobuleti	NA1 Igor Mikhalchenko	NA1 Aliaksei Kunitsa	NA2 Dmitriy Tsinman
2024	Brazilian, IDF	(Russia) Moscow Oblast	NA1 Igor Mikhalchenko	NA2 Sergey Belosheev	NA1 Andrey Valyuk
2026	Brazilian, IDF	(Russia) Moscow Oblast	(Belarus) Artem Tikhonov	(Russia) Nicolay Struchkov	(Russia) Roman Shchukin

== Blitz ==
Year	Type	Country	Gold	Silver	Bronze
1993	Brazilian	(Brazil) Águas de Lindóia	(United States) Iser Kuperman	(Russia) Alexander Schwartzman	(Latvia) Vladimir Vigman
1998	Russian	(Ukraine) Odesa	(Russia) Ivan Tokusarov	(Russia) Gavril Kolesov	(Russia) Nicolay Abatsiev
2000	Russian	(Ukraine) Odesa	(Uzbekistan) Markiel Fazilov	(Russia) Gavril Kolesov	(Russia) Nicolay Abatsiev
2002	Brazilian	(Brazil) São Paulo	(Russia) Gavril Kolesov	(Ukraine) Valery Grebenkin	(Russia) Aleksander Kandaurov (Ukraine) Yuri Anikeev
2003	Russian	(Ukraine) Simferopol	(Ukraine) Sergey Belosheev	(Russia) Gavril Kolesov	(Russia) Eugeny Novikov
2004	Brazilian	(Brazil) Ubatuba	(Ukraine) Sergey Belosheev	(Ukraine) Yuri Anikeev	(Russia) Aleksander Kandaurov
2005	Russian	(Ukraine) Eupatoria	(Russia) Murodoullo Amrillaev	(Ukraine) Sergey Belosheev	(Russia) Maxim Fedorov
2006	Russian	(Kazakhstan) Aktobe	(Russia) Murodoullo Amrillaev	(Ukraine) Sergey Belosheev	(Ukraine) Alexander Kolin
2007	Brazilian	(Germany) Saarbrücken	(Russia) Oleg Dashkov	(Brazil) Augusto Carvalho	(Lithuania) Andrius Kybartas
2008	Brazilian	(Brazil) Recife	(Russia) Gavril Kolesov	(Moldova) Ion Dosca	(Russia) Alexander Schwartzman
2009	Russian	(Russia) Chelyabinsk	(Russia) Gavril Kolesov	(Russia) Oleg Dashkov	(Russia) Dmitriy Tsinman
2011	Russian	(Russia) Saint Petersburg	(Ukraine) Sergey Belosheev	(Belarus) Eugeny Kondrachenko	(Belarus) Andrey Valyuk
2012	Brazilian	(France) Lille	(Ukraine) Denys Shkatula	(Ukraine) Sergey Belosheev	(Russia) Gavril Kolesov
2013	Russian	(Russia) Saint Petersburg	(Belarus) Igor Mikhalchenko	(Russia) Oleg Dashkov	(Russia) Gavril Kolesov
2015	Russian	(Russia) Saint Petersburg	(Belarus) Igor Mikhalchenko	(Russia) Nicolay Struchkov	(Russia) Sergey Belosheev
2017	Russian, IDF	(Russia) Saint Petersburg	(Russia) Gavril Kolesov	(Belarus) Igor Mikhalchenko	(Russia) Oleg Dashkov
2018	Brazilian, FMJD	(Turkey) İzmir	(Ukraine) Yuri Anikeev	(Russia) Alexander Schwarzman	(Russia) Murodoullo Amrillaev (Ukraine) Vladislav Antonovych
2018	Russian, FMJD	(Russia) Nizhnevartovsk	(Russia) Gavril Kolesov	(Russia) Nicolay Struchkov	(Russia) Oleg Dashkov
2019	Russian, IDF	(Bulgaria) Sveti Vlas	(Russia) Dmitriy Tsinman	(Belarus) Igor Mikhalchenko	(Belarus) Andrey Valyuk
2020	Brazilian, FMJD	(Turkey) Kuşadası	(Russia) Sergey Belosheev	(Russia) Nicolay Struchkov	(Russia) Nikolai Gulyaev
2022	Russian, IDF	(Georgia (country)) Kobuleti	NA1 Igor Mikhalchenko	NA1 Andrey Valyuk	IDF Arunas Norvaisas
2024	Brazilian, IDF	(Russia) Moscow Oblast	NA2 Roman Shchukin	NA1 Andrey Valyuk	NA1 Igor Mikhalchenko
2026	Russian, IDF	(Russia) Moscow Oblast	(Belarus) Igor Mikhalchenko	(Russia) Roman Shchukin	(Russia) Aisen Egorov
