= Carl "Buster" Smith =

American checkers player (1921–1992)

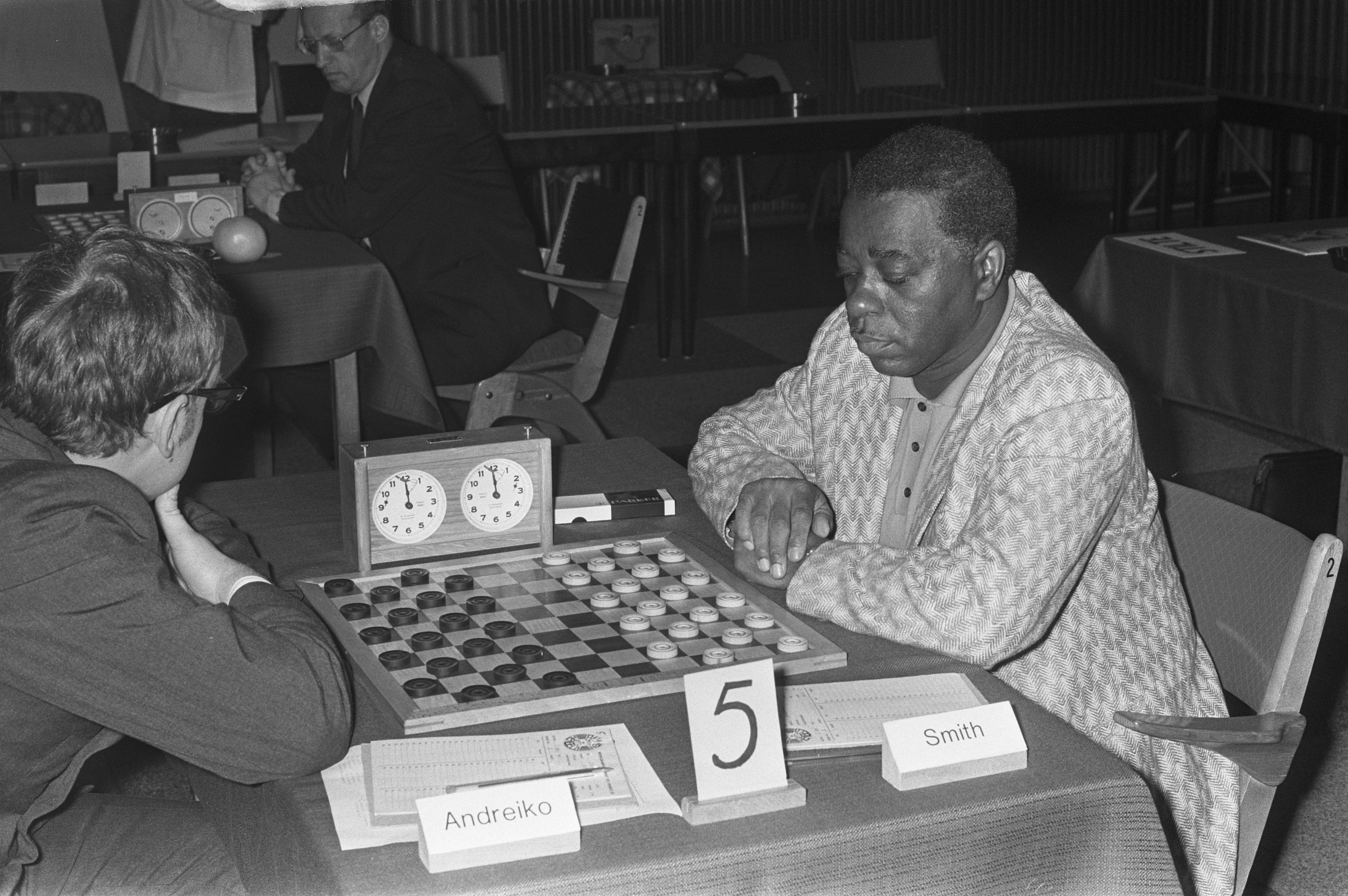
- Carl Smith (right) during the WC international draughts 1972 against Andris Andreiko.

Personal information
- Nickname: Buster
- Born: Carl Sylvester Smith; January 26, 1921
- Died: October 8, 1992 (aged 71)

Sport
- Sport: Draughts

Carl Sylvester "Buster" Smith (January 26, 1921 – October 8, 1992) was an eleven-time "Top Master" in the American Pool Checkers Association Division Championship. He won the Top Master title in 1967, 1970, 1972–76, 1982–83, 1991, and 1992, and Master in 1968 and 1969.

== Early life and career ==
Smith attended Wendell Phillips High School. He served in Okinawa during World War II.

He began playing in his native Chicago and was citywide champion by 17. He remained Chicago's best player until his death in 1992. He did not play for money, instead making his living working at the post office.

In 1968, 1972, 1976, and 1978, Smith participated in the World Championships for the international draughts variant. His highest placement was 5th in 1976.
