= 2018 World Draughts Championship match =

Draughts match between Alexander Schwartzman and Roel Boomstra

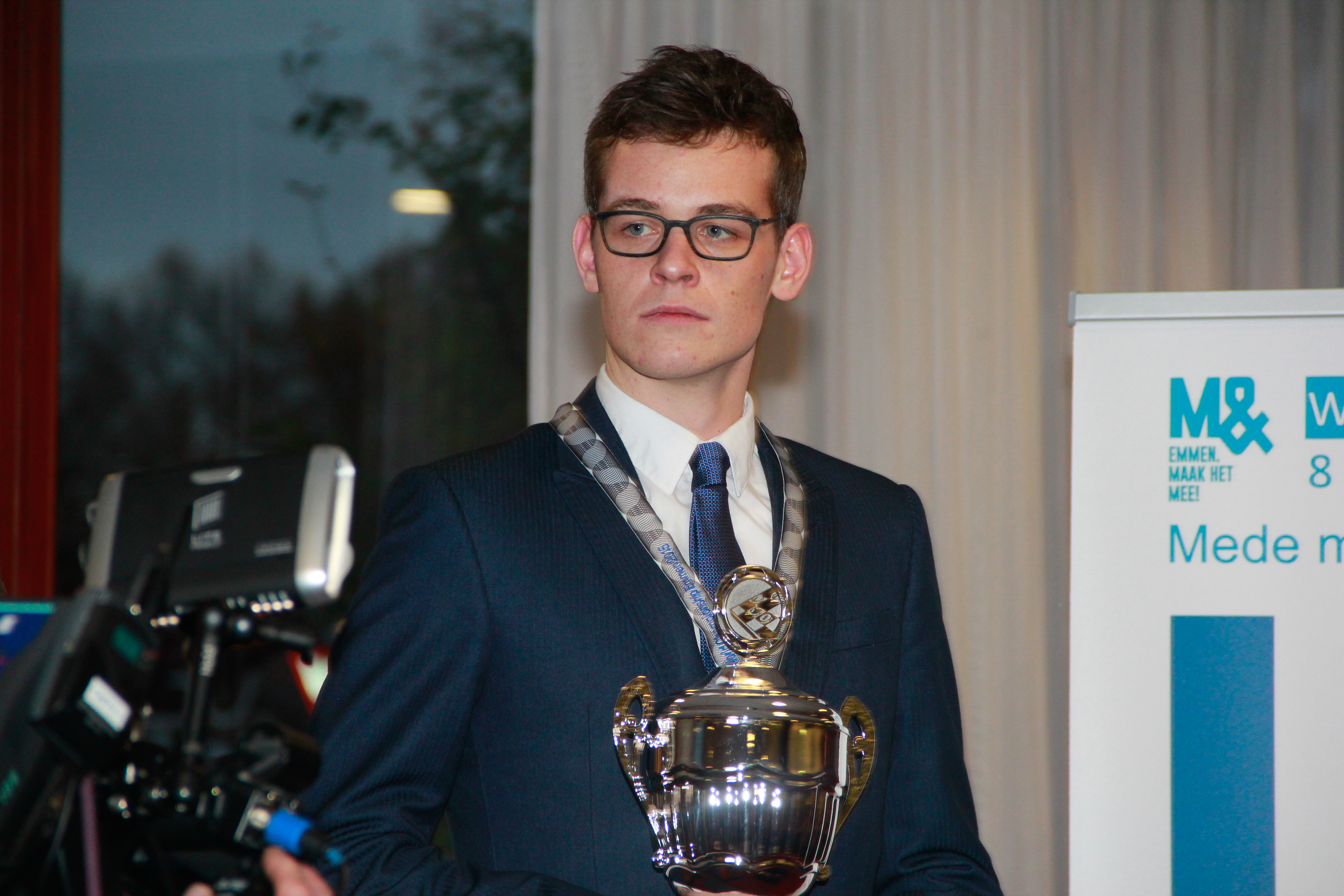
- 2018 World Draughts Champion Roel Boomstra

Tournament information
- Location: The Netherlands
- Dates: 28 December 2018–13 January 2019
- Administrator: FMJD
- Tournament format: Match

Final positions
- Champion: Roel Boomstra

The 2018 World Draughts Championship match in international draughts was held from 28 December, 2018, to 13 January, 2019, in the Netherlands. It was held under the auspices of the International Draughts Federation (FMJD) and played between the 2017 world champion, Alexander Schwartzman, and the 2016 world champion, Roel Boomstra. Roel Boomstra won the match and became World Draughts Champion.

== Rules and regulations ==
The match consisted of 12 games, played with a time control of 80 minutes plus a 1-minute increment per move. The player with the highest score won the world title if he won at least three games. If not, tie-break games were played until one player achieved a third overall win.

The first tie-break was 3 rapid games, 20 minutes plus a 10-second increment per move. The second tie-break was 3 blitz games, 10 minutes plus a 5-second increment per move. The third tie-break was Superblitz (limited time for an unlimited number of games until the first victory), 10 minutes plus a 2-second increment per move.

Preliminary tie-breaking games were to be played if the first six games ended in a draw. These tie-break games were played until the first victory.

== Schedule ==
Date	Local time	Event	Venue	Host city
28 December 2018	11:00	Opening	Paleis het Stadhouderlijk Hof	Leeuwarden
28 December 2018	13:00	Game 1	Paleis het Stadhouderlijk Hof	Leeuwarden
29 December 2018	12:00	Game 2	Tresoar	Leeuwarden
2 January 2019	13:00	Game 3	Paleis het Stadhouderlijk Hof	Leeuwarden
3 January 2019	12:00	Game 4	Paleis het Stadhouderlijk Hof	Leeuwarden
4 January 2019	12:00	Game 5	Van Swinderen Huys	Groningen
5 January 2019	12:00	Game 6	Van Swinderen Huys	Groningen
6 January 2019	10:00	Tie-break (not played)	Van Swinderen Huys	Groningen
7 January 2019	12:00	Game 7	Van Swinderen Huys	Groningen
8 January 2019	12:00	Game 8	Van Swinderen Huys	Groningen
9 January 2019	12:00	Game 9	Drents Museum	Assen
10 January 2019	12:00	Game 10	Drents Museum	Assen
11 January 2019	12:00	Game 11	Drents Museum	Assen
12 January 2019	12:00	Game 12	RTV Drenthe	Assen
13 January 2019	10:00	Tie-break	RTV Drenthe	Assen

== Results ==
=== Regular games ===
Player	Rating	1	2	3	4	5	6	7	8	9	10	11	12	Points	Victories
(Netherlands) Roel Boomstra	2408	1	1	1	1	1	2	1	1	1	1	1	1	13	1
(Russia) Alexander Schwartzman	2393	1	1	1	1	1	0	1	1	1	1	1	1	11	0

=== Tie-break games ===
Player	Rating rapid/blitz	Rapid game 1	Rapid game 2	Rapid game 3	Blitz game 1	Blitz game 2	Blitz game 3	Superblitz game 1	Superblitz game 2	Points	Victories
(Netherlands) Roel Boomstra	2432	1	1	1	2	1	1	1	2	23	2
(Russia) Alexander Schwartzman	2486	1	1	1	0	1	1	1	0	17	0

== See also ==
- Draughts World Championship
