= American Pool Checkers =

Variant of draughts

American Pool Checkers, also called "American Pool", is a variant of checkers, mainly played in the mid-Atlantic and Southeastern United States and in Puerto Rico.

== Basic rules ==
	1		2		3		4
5		6		7		8
	9		10		11		12
13		14		15		16
	17		18		19		20
21		22		23		24
	25		26		27		28
29		30		31		32

The starting position of pool checkers, as well as English draughts

As in the related game English draughts (also known as American checkers or straight checkers), the game is played on an 8x8 board with the double corner (corner without a checker) to each player's right. The dark pieces player starts the game by making the first move. One difference from the rules of English checkers is that a piece may capture both forward and backward. A player must capture an opponent's checker when possible (both forward and backward), but if two possibilities exist, the player may choose the sequence (even if one sequence has more jumps). The pieces are not removed until all jumps are completed and the player's hand is removed from his piece. A player may not capture an opponent more than one time. A player may not capture his own pieces.

Another difference is that kings are flying kings, which means that a king can jump any number of squares forward and backward. A king can make right turns after a jump and continue along another path after successfully taking an opponent. A king must also make all the possible jumps during a sequence. If the condition arises that one player has three kings and the other has just one king, the player who has the three kings must win within thirteen moves (even if the fourteenth move is a capture).

== Past champions of the American Pool Checker Association ==
Names of champions in the several divisions are listed with the APCA club that they represent.

All Tournament Results 2005–2019

Championship Divisions
Year / Place	Top Master	Master	Junior Master	Gold Bar	Blue Ribbon
2019 Memphis, Tennessee	Al "Eastpoint" Alfred Barnett, Sparta, Georgia	James Lyles, Georgia	Antony Tanqwa	George Dozier, Memphis, Tennessee	Nolan McCaskill
2018 Baltimore, Maryland	Al "Eastpoint" Alfred Barnett, Sparta, Georgia	Michael Tramaine Adkins, Alapaha, Georgia	General Owens, Chicago, Illinois	Charles Smith, Bartlett, Tennessee	Robbie Mason
2017 Chicago, Illinois	Al "Eastpoint" Alfred Barnett, Sparta, Georgia	Derrick Williams, Memphis, Tennessee	Kemraj Rambarr, New Jersey	Sonny Towns, Trotwood, Ohio	Charles Smith, Memphis, Tennessee
2016 Durham, North Carolina	Al "Eastpoint" Alfred Barnett, Sparta, Georgia	Charlie Williams, Kentucky	Joe Davis, Louisburg, North Carolina	Booker Neely, Mantee, Mississippi	James McQuay, Jacksonville, Florida
2015 Albany, Georgia	Al "Eastpoint" Alfred Barnett, Sparta, Georgia	Eugene "Sailorboy" McCloud, Moultrie, Georgia	James Lyles, Georgia	Ronald Jackson, Macon, Georgia	Stevie L. Scott, Lakeland Florida
2014 Memphis, Tennessee	Al "Eastpoint" Alfred Barnett, Sparta, Georgia	Freddie Welcher, Augusta, Georgia	Derrick Williams, Memphis, Tennessee	Joe Davis, Louisburg, North Carolina	Kenneth Jones, Havana, Florida
2013 Columbia, South Carolina	Calvin Monroe, Atlanta, Georgia; Al "Eastpoint" Alfred Barnett, Sparta, Georgia	Carlye Lasane, Columbia, South Carolina	Alexander McNair, Durham, North Carolina	Michael Tramaine Adkins, Alapaha, Georgia	Cornelius McCleod, South Carolina
2012 Atlanta, Georgia	Al "Eastpoint" Alfred Barnett, Sparta, Georgia	Michael Weaver, Washington, D.C.	Alex Issac, Darlington, South Carolina	Derrick Williams, Memphis, Tennessee	Walter A. Adams, Atlanta, Georgia
2011 Columbus, Ohio	Calvin Monroe, Atlanta, Georgia	Fred D. Shurn, Chicago, Illinois	Michael Weaver, Washington, D.C.	Khemraj Rambarran, Washington, D.C.	Robert Firstlist, St. Louis, Missouri
2010 Durham, North Carolina	Al "Eastpoint" Alfred Barnett, Atlanta, Georgia; Calvin Monroe, Atlanta, Georgia	Tim Moore, Durham, North Carolina	Toney Simuel, Washington, D.C.	Michael Weaver, Washington, D.C.	William Wilkerson, Durham, NC
2009 Washington, D.C.	Calvin Monroe, Atlanta, Georgia	Kim Williams, Washington, D.C.	Thomas Fletcher, Washington, D.C.	Toney Simuel, Washington, D.C.	William Ham Apex, North Carolina
2008 Chicago, Illinois	Calvin Monroe, Atlanta, Georgia	Arthur McCarr, Tampa, Florida	Kim Williams, Washington, D.C.	General Owens, Chicago, Illinois	Joe Davis, Louisburg, NC
2007 Chicago	Al Lambert, Chicago, Illinois	Clinton Thang & David Jackson Macon, GA	Gregory Green, Macon, Georgia	Kim Williams, Virginia Beach, Va.	Derrick Williams, Memphis, Tennessee
2006 Columbus, Ohio	Calvin Monroe, Atlanta, Georgia	John Williams, Washington, D.C.	Larry Lindsay, Piedmont	Tommie Ferrell, Athens, Georgia	Keith Brown, St. Louis, Missouri
2005 Atlanta, Georgia	Al "Eastpoint" Alfred Barnett, Sparta, Georgia; Calvin Monroe, Atlanta, Georgia	Willie Robinson, Atlanta, Georgia	Hammond Clark, Atlanta, Georgia	Reggie King, Miami, Florida	Toney Simuel, Atlanta, Georgia
2004 Memphis, Tennessee	Calvin Monroe, Atlanta, Georgia	Edward Danzy, Detroit, Michigan	Jessie Sherfield, Memphis, Tennessee	Freddie Lambert, Durham, NC	Robert Hunt, Miami, Florida
2003 Atlanta, Georgia	Al "Eastpoint" Alfred Barnett, Sparta, Georgia	Homer King, Macon	Edward Danzy, Detroit, Michigan	Alexander McNair, Piedmont	Alexander Eley, Atlanta, Georgia
2002 Washington, D.C.	Calvin Monroe Georgia; Charlie Brown, Baltimore; Alexander Katz, New York	Albert Harrison, North Carolina; Joe Wilson, Memphis, Tennessee	John Williams, Washington, D.C.	Robert N. Johnson, Piedmont	Michael Weaver, Washington, D.C.
2000 Columbus, Ohio	Ion Dosca, Moldova	Clorius Lay, Gary	Arthur McCarr, Tampa	Keith Goodman, Atlanta, Georgia	Lynwood Tharrington, Piedmont
1999 Memphis, Tennessee	Al "Eastpoint" Alfred Barnett, Sparta, Georgia	Frank Cox, Bahamas	Donald Jackson, Macon	Emmett Smith, Georgia	James Lanier, Piedmont
1998 Atlanta, Georgia	Al "Eastpoint" Alfred Barnett, Sparta, Georgia	Louis Rufus, St. Louis	David Jackson, Macon	Timothy Moore, Piedmont	Vilner Philippe, Bahamas; Emanuel Rogers, St. Louis
1997 Flint, Michigan	Al "Eastpoint" Alfred Barnett, Sparta, Georgia	Alex Golodets, Memphis, Tennessee	Joseph Wilson, Memphis, Tennessee	Willie Robinson, Midwest, Ohio	Elliott Eley, St. Louis
1996 Houston, Texas	Al "Eastpoint" Alfred Barnett, Sparta, Georgia	Anatoliy Grupin, Los Angeles, California; Anthony Simmons, Georgia	Servin Hanna, Bahamas	Chauncey Smith, St. Louis	Timothy Moore, Piedmont
1995 Augusta, Georgia	Al "Eastpoint" Alfred Barnett, Sparta, Georgia; Elton Williams, Flint	Vincent 'Dino' Dean, Bahamas	Freddie Welcher, Augusta	Gary Watson, Florida	Eugene Davis, Georgia
1994 Winston-Salem, North Carolina	Calvin Monroe, Georgia	Timothy Irving, Houston, Texas	Fred Shurn, Chicago, Illinois	Rodger Knowles, Bahamas	William Byrant, Piedmont
1993 Petal, Mississippi	Elton Williams, Flint	Orlando Williams, Chicago, Illinois	Anatoliy Grupin, Los Angeles, California	Wayne Lockheart, Toledo, Ohio	Clinton Murphy, Georgia
1992 Nassau, Bahamas	Carl Smith, Chicago, Illinois; Andrew Frazier, Bahamas	Charles Hudson, Detroit, Michigan	Michael Williams, Bahamas	Leonard Bains, Bahamas	General Owens, Chicago, Illinois
1991 Los Angeles, California	Carl Smith, Chicago, Illinois	Melvin Martin, NA	Frank Cox, Bahamas	Therman Earnest, Chicago, Illinois	Joe Bailey, LA
1990 Atlanta, Georgia	Iser Kuperman, Midwest, Ohio	Simon Levine, NA	Willie Robinson, Georgia	Obie Rufus, Memphis, Tennessee	Leonard Bain, Bahamas
1989 Columbus, Ohio	Iser Kuperman, NA	Valentine Cox, Bahamas	Nelson Moore, St. Louis	Clifford Johnson, Chicago, Illinois	Crover Kennedy, LA; Christopher Stinson, LA
1988 Detroit, Michigan	Iser Kuperman, NA	Sylvester Wilson, NA; Al Lambert, Chicago, Illinois	Orlando Williams, Chicago, Illinois	Fred Shurn, Chicago, Illinois	Joseph Capers, Detroit, Michigan
1987 Memphis, Tennessee	Iser Kuperman, Bahamas	Henry Stokes, Memphis, Tennessee	Albert Harrison, Winston-Salem	Jessie Sheffield, Memphis, Tennessee	Fred Shurn, Chicago, Illinois
1986 St. Louis, Missouri	Iser Kuperman, Bahamas	Henry Miller, Georgia; Andrew Frazier, Bahamas	Valentine Cox, Bahamas	Frank Cox, Bahamas	Garland Kilpatrick, LA
1985 Dayton, Ohio	Iser Kuperman, Bahamas	James Garrett, Winston-Salem	Andrew Frazier, Bahamas	Robert Butler, Bahamas	Eddie Smith, Chicago, Illinois
1984 Nassau, Bahamas	Iser Kuperman, Bahamas	Neil Wright, NA	James Chambers, Bahamas	Andrew Frazier, Bahamas	Roger Knowles, NA
1983 Chicago, Illinois	Carl Smith, Chicago, Illinois	George Briscoe, Berston/Flint	Al Lambert, Chicago, Illinois	Louis Rufus, St. Louis	Wayne Lockheart, Toledo, Ohio
1982 Akron, Ohio	Carl Smith, Chicago, Illinois	James Shell, Georgia	Eugene Hampton, Berston/Flint	Valentine Cox, Bahamas	Sylvester Wilson, Berston/Flint
1981 Memphis, Tennessee	Momodou Fall, Georgia	James Stone, Georgia	Homer King, Georgia	McBee Smith, Cleveland, Ohio	Robert Johnson, Chicago, Illinois
1980 Washington, D.C.	Momodou Faal, Georgia	Rembert Ford, Detroit; Parmalee McClammey, Brooklyn	Bobby Hodo, Chicago, Illinois	Dan Flowers, Detroit, Michigan	Prince Garland, Washington
1979 Winston-Salem, North Carolina	Momodou Faal, Georgia; Vladimir Kaplan, N.Y. Dream; Elton Williams, Berston/Flint	Larry Stepter, Memphis, Tennessee	Parmalee McClammey, Brooklyn	Bobby Hodo, Chicago, Illinois	Emory Myrick, Brooklyn
1978 Detroit, Michigan	Vladimir Kaplan, N.Y. Dream	Jesse Hurst, Memphis, Tennessee	Charles Hudson, Detroit, Michigan	Ben Rice, Detroit, Michigan	Johnny Jamerson, Piedmont
1977 Atlanta, Georgia	Vladimir Kaplan, N.Y. Dream	Joel Marshall, Georgia	C.P. Rudy, N.Y. Dream	Parmalee McClammey, Brooklyn	Bobby Hodo, Detroit, Michigan
1976 Memphis, Tennessee	Carl Smith, Chicago, Illinois	Raleigh Taylor, Brooklyn	James Sharp, Chicago, Illinois	Luther Murray, Detroit, Michigan	Jesse Sheffield, Memphis, Tennessee
1975 Chicago, Illinois	Carl Smith, Chicago, Illinois	Ohio Mitchell, Chicago, Illinois	Larry Stepter, Memphis, Tennessee	Stephen Trader, Harlem Pk.	S. Saneigeyman, Cleveland, Ohio
1974 St. Louis, Missouri	Carl Smith, Chicago, Illinois	Charles McDuffie, St. Louis	Alex Femandez, Brooklyn	Jesse Galloway, N.Y. Dream	Leroy Thomas, Chicago, Illinois
1973 New York, New York	Carl Smith, Chicago, Illinois	Elton Williams, Berston/Flint	Jasper Grayson, NA	Alex Femandez, Brooklyn	Stephen Trader, Harlem Pk.
1972 Detroit, Michigan	Carl Smith, Chicago, Illinois	See Top Masters	Elton Williams, Berston/Flint	Charles Florene, Chicago, Illinois	Ray Lawrence, N.Y. Dream
1971 Flint, Michigan	Victor Krafft, Chicago, Illinois; Ollie Howard, N.Y. Dream	See Top Masters	Joel Marshall, Georgia	Elton Williams, Berston/Flint	Eddie Reynolds, Cleveland, Ohio
1970 Cleveland, Ohio	Carl Smith, Chicago, Illinois	Carl Smith, Chicago, Illinois	Wood Williamson, Detroit, Michigan	Rudy Slade, N.Y. Dream	Elton Williams, Berston/Flint
1969 Atlanta, Georgia	William Langley, Detroit, Michigan	Carl Smith, Chicago, Illinois	Frank Mitchell, Georgia	James Turner, Detroit, Michigan	Archie Hinton, Georgia
1968 Detroit, Michigan	Charlie Carter, Georgia	Carl Smith, Chicago, Illinois	Ben White, Detroit, Michigan	Pierce Towns, Georgia	Walter Hall, Berston/Flint
1967 Detroit, Michigan	Carl Smith, Chicago, Illinois	George Lyons, Cleveland	James Shell, Georgia	Howard Jackson, Georgia	Michael Jordan, Georgia
1966 Detroit, Michigan	George Sykes, Detroit, Michigan	George Sykes, Detroit, Michigan	Rembert Ford, Detroit, Michigan	Howard Jackson, Georgia	Michael Jordan, Georgia
