= Murodoullo Amrillaev =

Tajik and Russian draughts player

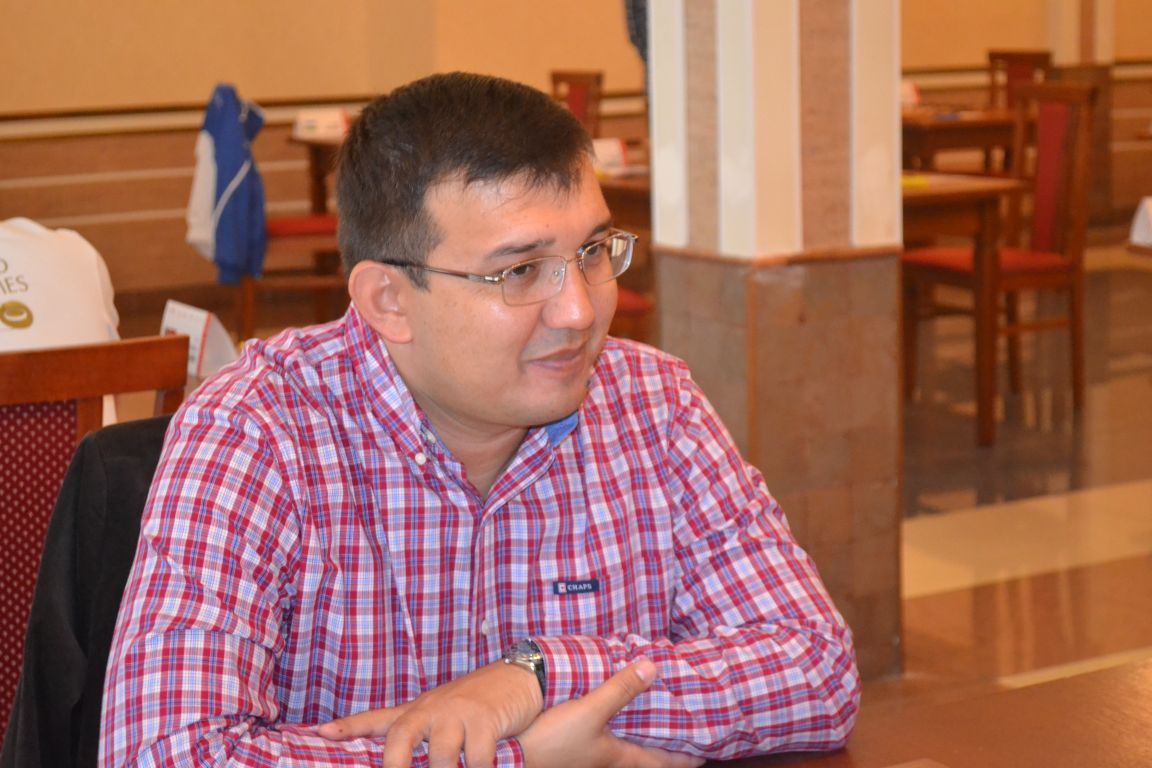
Amrillaev in the World Championship 2013.

Murodoullo Amrillaev (Russian: Муродулло Амриллаев, born 5 May 1972, in Dushanbe, Soviet Union) is a Tajik and Russian draughts player and was international draughts world champion in draughts-64 (Russian version) in 1993. Since 1995 he has lived in Sterlitamak, Russia. He played for the club Bashneft and has been an international grandmaster (GMI) since 1994.
