= Alexander Getmanski =

Russian draughts grandmaster (born 1977)

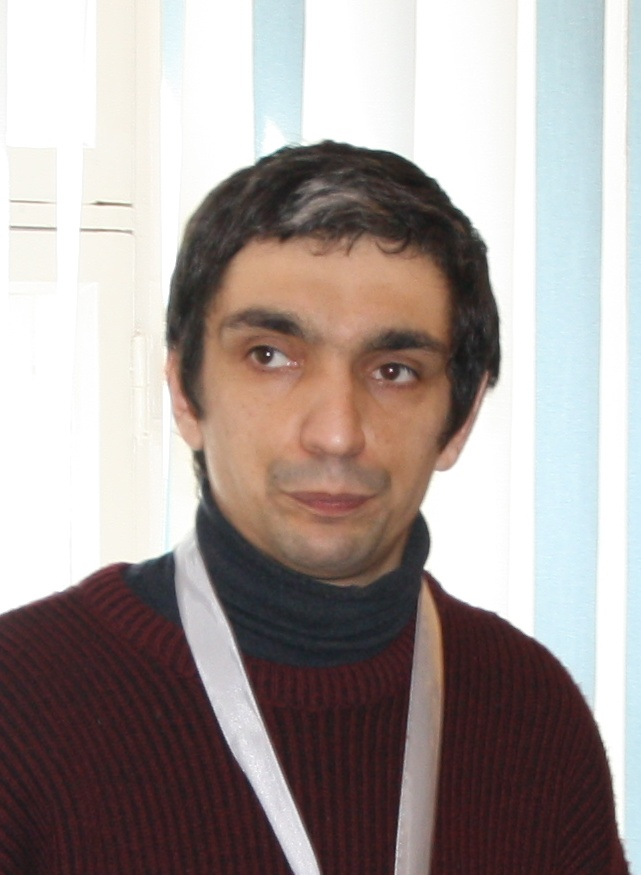

Personal information
- Born: October 6, 1977 (age 48) Tula, USSR

Sport
- Country: Russia
- Sport: Draughts
- Rank: Grandmaster (1998)
- Now coaching: Boris Oksman, Vyacheslav Shchyogolev

Achievements and titles
- National finals: 3
- Highest world ranking: No. 3 (July 2015)
- Personal best: 2413 (April 2006, rating)

Alexander Eduardovich Getmanski (Russian: Александр Эдуардович Гетманский; born October 6, 1977, Tula) is a Russian draughts player (International draughts and draughts-64), author of books on draughts.

A professional historian, Candidate of Historical Sciences. Graduated from Tolstoy TSPU in 1999 and completed postgraduate studies at Chernyshevsky SSU in 2001. Member of the editorial board of the journal “Shashechny Mir” and correspondent for the Dutch draughts magazine “Hoofdlijn.”

He took third place at Draughts-64 World Championship in 2003, also he took second place at Draughts World Championship 2017 in rapid and third place in blitz in 2016 year. Winner of Junior World Championship in 1996 and 1997. Three times winner of Russian championship. International grandmaster (GMI).

== World championship ==
- 1997 (4 place in semifinal group B)
- 2001 (15 place)
- 2003 (9 place)
- 2005 (10 place)
- 2011 (11 place)
- 2013 (5 place)
- 2017 (5 place in semifinal group С)
- 2021 (2 place)

== European championship ==
- 1999 (6 place)
- 2002 (9-16 place)
- 2006 (15 place)
- 2008 (13 place)
- 2010 (13 place)
- 2012 (21 place)
- 2014 (5 place)
- 2016 (7 place)
- 2018 (7 place)

== Russian championship ==
- 1997 (2 place)
- 1998 (1 place)
- 1999 (1 place)
- 2003 (3 place)
- 2004 (3 place)
- 2005 (2 place)
- 2006 (3 place)
- 2007 (3 place)
- 2009 (2 place)
- 2011 (2 place)
- 2015 (1 place)
- 2017 (2 place)
- 2020 (2 place)
- 2021 (2 place)

== Books ==
- Гетманский А. Э., Гетманский Э. Д. Шашечные баталии на стоклеточной доске : Стат. анализ чемпионатов СССР по междунар. шашкам (1954—1991) / — Тула : Инфра, 2003. — 331 с.
- Aleksander Getmanski. Tajemnice 64-polowej damy. PS-BEST Szczecin 2007. - 148 с. ISBN 978-83-924787-1-3.
- Александр Гетманский. Курс принципиальных шашечных дебютов на 100-клетках - М.: Изд-во "ГРАФПРЕСС", 2014. - 328 с. ISBN 978-5-906216-06-9.
- Aleksander Getmanski. Kurs debiutow. PS-BEST Szczecin 2017. - 428 с. ISBN 978-83-924787-9-9.
