= Alexander Schwarzman =

Russian draughts grandmaster (born 1967)

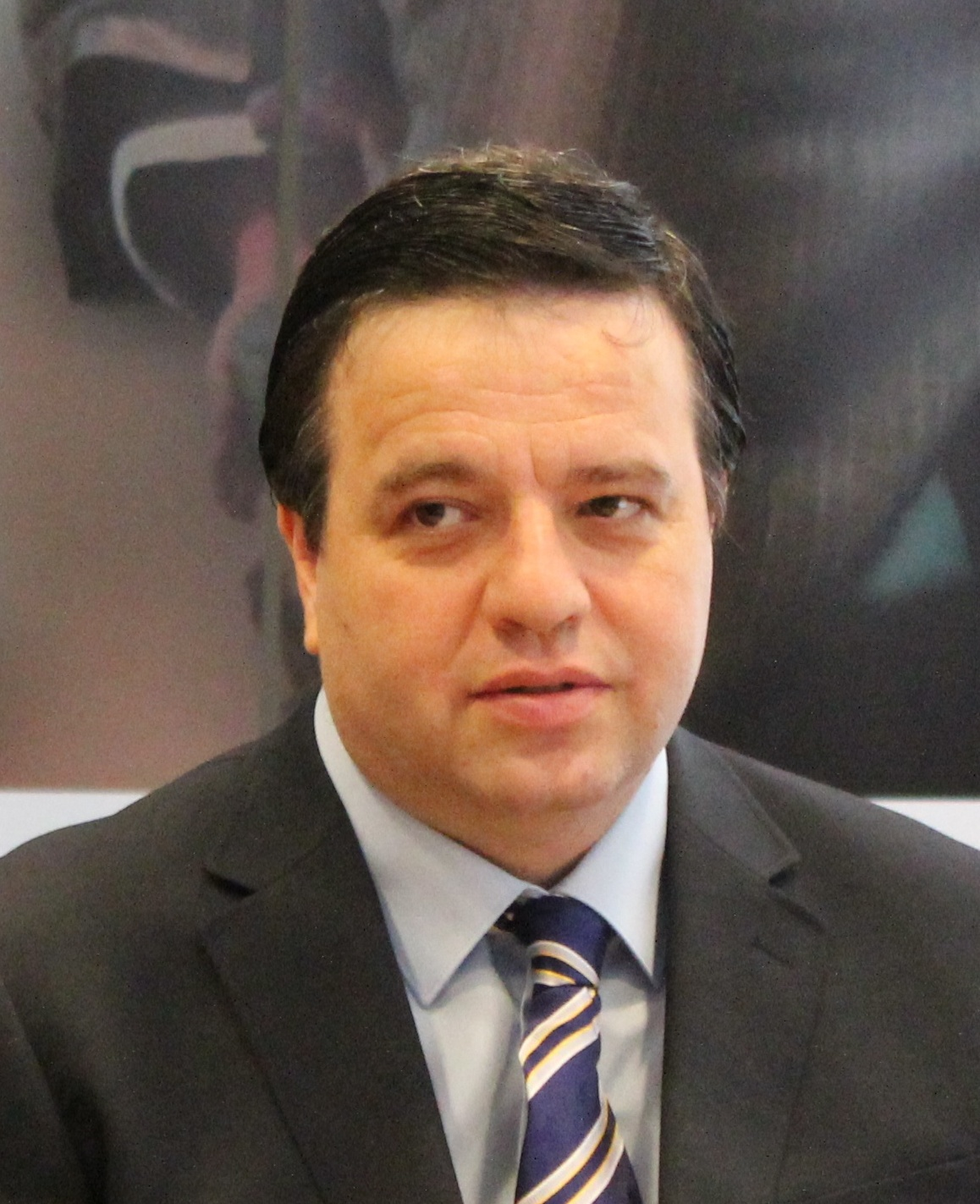
- Schwarzman in 2013

Personal information
- Born: September 18, 1967 (age 58) Moscow, Russian SFSR, Soviet Union

Sport
- Country: Israel (since 2023)
- Sport: Draughts
- Rank: Grandmaster (1991)

Achievements and titles
- Highest world ranking: No. 1 (October 2014)
- Personal best: 2472 (January 1999, rating)

Alexander Mikhailovich Schwarzman (Russian: Александр Михайлович Шварцман; born 18 September 1967 in Moscow) is a Russian international grandmaster in international draughts, Russian draughts and Brazilian draughts. He is known for his creative playing style, especially his positional sacrifices and his high number of elegant games involving encirclements.

Schwarzman currently represents the Israeli Draughts Federation.

== Notable achievements ==
- World champion (international draughts) 1998, 2007, 2009, 2017, 2021.
- World champion (Brazilian draughts) 1987, 1989, 1993, 1996, 1997, 2008, 2018.
- Russian national champion (international draughts) 1993, 1996, 2003, 2004 and 2008.
- Russian national champion (Russian draughts) 1987, 1989, 1993, 1996 and 1997.
- Winner of Bijlmer Tournament 1997, 1998 and 2006.
- European champion 2002.

Schwarzman is the only grandmaster in three types of draughts: Brazilian, Russian and international.
