= Russian draughts =

Board game

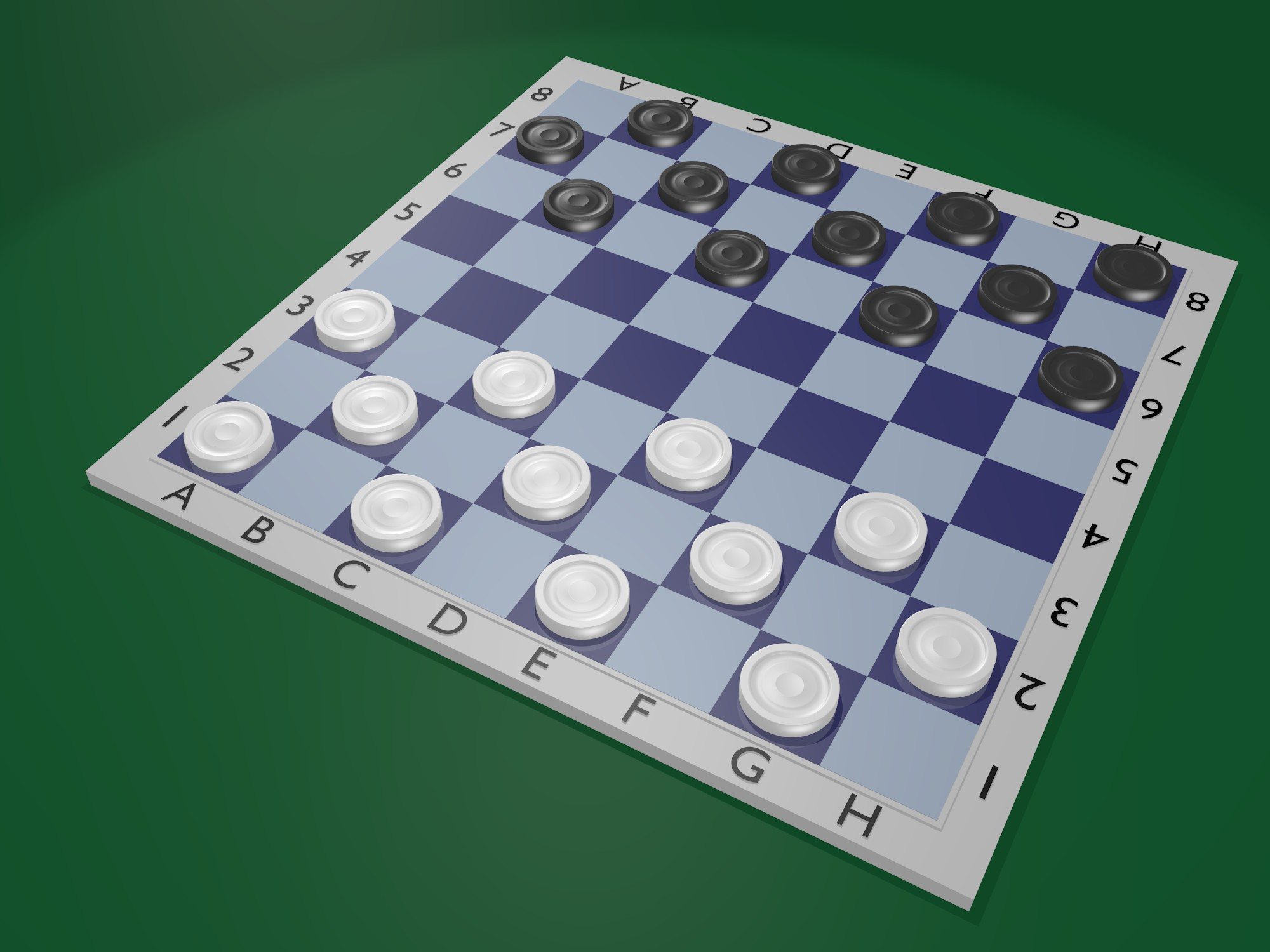
- Russian draughts starting position
- Genres: Board game Abstract strategy game
- Players: 2
- Setup time: 10–60 seconds
- Playing time: 5 minutes for blitz 15 minutes for rapid 45 minutes for classic
- Chance: None
- Skills: Strategy

Russian draughts (also known as Shashki or Russian shashki) is a variant of draughts (checkers) played in Russia and most parts of the former USSR, as well as parts of Eastern Europe and Israel.

== Rules ==
As in all draughts variants, Russian draughts is played by two people, on opposite sides of a playing board, alternating moves. One player has dark pieces, and the other has light pieces. Pieces move diagonally and pieces of the opponent are captured by jumping over them.

The rules of this variant of draughts are:

- Board. Played on an 8×8 board with alternating dark and light squares. The left square of the first rank should be dark.
- Starting position. Each player starts with 12 pieces on the three rows closest to their own side. The row closest to each player is called the "crownhead" or "kings row". Usually, the colors of the pieces are black and white, but it is possible to use other colors (one dark and other light). The player with white pieces (lighter color) moves first.
- Pieces. There are two kinds of pieces: "men" and "kings". Kings are differentiated as consisting of two normal pieces of the same color, stacked one on top of the other or by inverted pieces.
- Men. Men move forward diagonally to an adjacent unoccupied square.
- Kings. If a player's piece moves into the kings row on the opposing player's side of the board, that piece is to be "crowned", becoming a "king" and gaining the ability to move backwards as well as forwards and to choose on which free square on this diagonal to stop.
- Capture. If the adjacent square contains an opponent's piece, and the square immediately beyond it is vacant, the opponent's piece must be captured (and removed from the game) by jumping over it. Jumping can be done forward and backward. Multiple-jump moves are possible if, when the jumping piece lands, there is another piece that can be jumped. When there is more than one way for a player to jump, one may choose which sequence to make, not necessarily the sequence that will result in the most captures. However, one must make all the captures in that sequence. A captured piece is left on the board until all captures in a sequence have been made but cannot be jumped again (this rule also applies for the kings).
- If a man touches the kings row during a capture and can continue a capture, it jumps backwards as a king. The player can choose where to land after the capture.
- Winning and draws. A player with no valid move remaining loses. This is the case if the player either has no pieces left or if a player's pieces are obstructed from making a legal move by the pieces of the opponent. A game is a draw if neither opponent has the possibility to win the game. The game is considered a draw when the same position repeats itself for the third time, with the same player having the move each time. If one player proposes a draw and his opponent accepts the offer. If a player has three kings (or more) in the game against a single enemy king and his 15th move (counting from the time of establishing the correlation of forces) cannot capture enemy king. If during 15 moves both players moved only kings, without moving any men and without making any capture.

== Notation ==
Games and positions are recorded using a special notation – algebraic notation. The vertical columns of squares are labeled from a to h. The horizontal rows of squares are numbered 1 to 8 starting from White's side of the board. Thus each square of the board has a unique identification of file letter followed by rank number.

- Moves from e3 to d4 are recorded as e3-d4.
- Moves with capture are recorded as c5:e3 (used a colon, :).

 1. e3-d4 d6-c5
 2. g3-f4?? c5:e3:g5
 3. ...

	1		2		3		4
5		6		7		8
	9		10		11		12
13		14		15		16
	17		18		19		20
21		22		23		24
	25		26		27		28
29		30		31		32

Starting position. White move first.

	1		2		3		4
5		6		7		8
	9		10		11		12
13		14		15		16
	17		18		19		20
21		22		23		24
	25		26		27		28
29		30		31		32

After 1. e3-d4

	1		2		3		4
5		6		7		8
	9		10		11		12
13		14		15		16
	17		18		19		20
21		22		23		24
	25		26		27		28
29		30		31		32

After 1. e3-d4 d6-c5

	1		2		3		4
5		6		7		8
	9		10		11		12
13		14		15		16
	17		18		19		20
21		22		23		24
	25		26		27		28
29		30		31		32

After 2. g3-f4??

	1		2		3		4
5		6		7		8
	9		10		11		12
13		14		15		16
	17		18		19		20
21		22		23		24
	25		26		27		28
29		30		31		32

After c5:e3:g5

== Sport ==
Official rules were printed in Russia in 1884. The first Russian championship was held in 1894. The following three took place in 1895, 1898 and 1901.

The first championship in the Soviet Union occurred in 1924, first women's championship was in 1936. From 1924 to 1991 there were 51 men's championships and 35 women's. Following the collapse of the Soviet Union, championships have been held in the Russian Federation, Ukraine, Belarus and other Post-Soviet states.

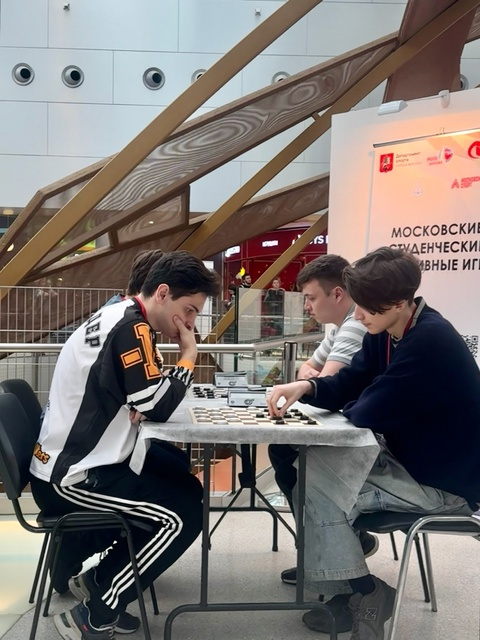
Student competition at Russian draughts

The first world championship of Russian draughts occurred in 1993 as part of the World championship in draughts-64 (Russian and Brazilian variant — since 1985) under the auspices of the Section-64 World Draughts Federation. The European championship of Russian draughts is held as part of the European championship in draughts-64 (Russian and Brazilian), as well as at national championships.

== Games based on main rules of Russian draughts ==
There are several variants of draughts games based on main rules of Russian draughts. Amongst the most popular ones is ″Poddavki″, where a player wins if he doesn't have any legal moves on his turn (either by giving up all of his checkers or having them being blocked). Another popular variant is called "Bashni" ("Towers"), where captured pieces are not removed from the game, but placed underneath the capturing piece, forming a "tower".

Another variant is played on a 10x8 board (2 additional columns, labelled 'i' and 'k'). Similar to Capablanca chess, this variant probably emerged from adapting a 10x10 game to play more quickly. There are official championships for shashki and its variants.

Another variant, invented by Grandmaster Vladimir Vigman, exists in which each player has 24 pieces (two full sets) — one on the white squares, second on the black. Each player plays two games simultaneously: one game on the white squares, other game on the dark squares. The total result is the sum of the results of both games.

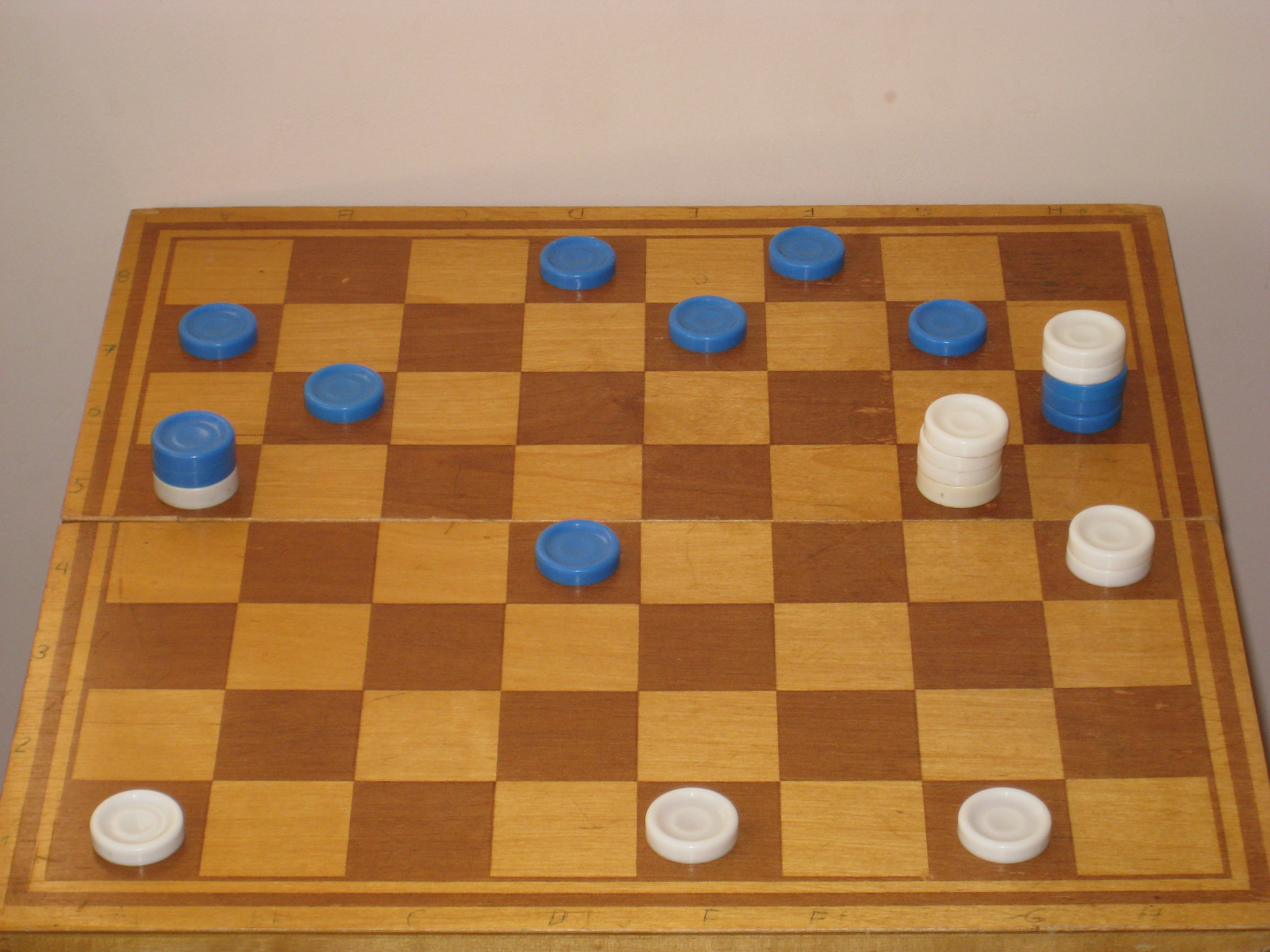
Position in game Bashni. There are three light towers and one dark.

	1		2		3		4
5		6		7		8
	9		10		11		12
13		14		15		16
	17		18		19		20
21		22		23		24
	25		26		27		28
29		30		31		32

The Vigman's draughts

	a	b	c	d	e	f	g	h	i	j
8	a8	b8 j 0	c8	d8 j 0	e8	f8 j 0	g8	h8 j 0	i8	j8 j 0	8
7	a7 j 0	b7	c7 j 0	d7	e7 j 0	f7	g7 j 0	h7	i7 j 0	j7	7
6	a6	b6 j 0	c6	d6 j 0	e6	f6 j 0	g6	h6 j 0	i6	j6 j 0	6
5	a5	b5	c5	d5	e5	f5	g5	h5	i5	j5	5
4	a4	b4	c4	d4	e4	f4	g4	h4	i4	j4	4
3	a3 j 1	b3	c3 j 1	d3	e3 j 1	f3	g3 j 1	h3	i3 j 1	j3	3
2	a2	b2 j 1	c2	d2 j 1	e2	f2 j 1	g2	h2 j 1	i2	j2 j 1	2
1	a1 j 1	b1	c1 j 1	d1	e1 j 1	f1	g1 j 1	h1	i1 j 1	j1	1
	a	b	c	d	e	f	g	h	i	j

80 square draughts

== See also ==
- List of Draughts-64 World Championship winners
- Tanzanian draughts
