= 2025 World Draughts Championship =

Draughts tournament

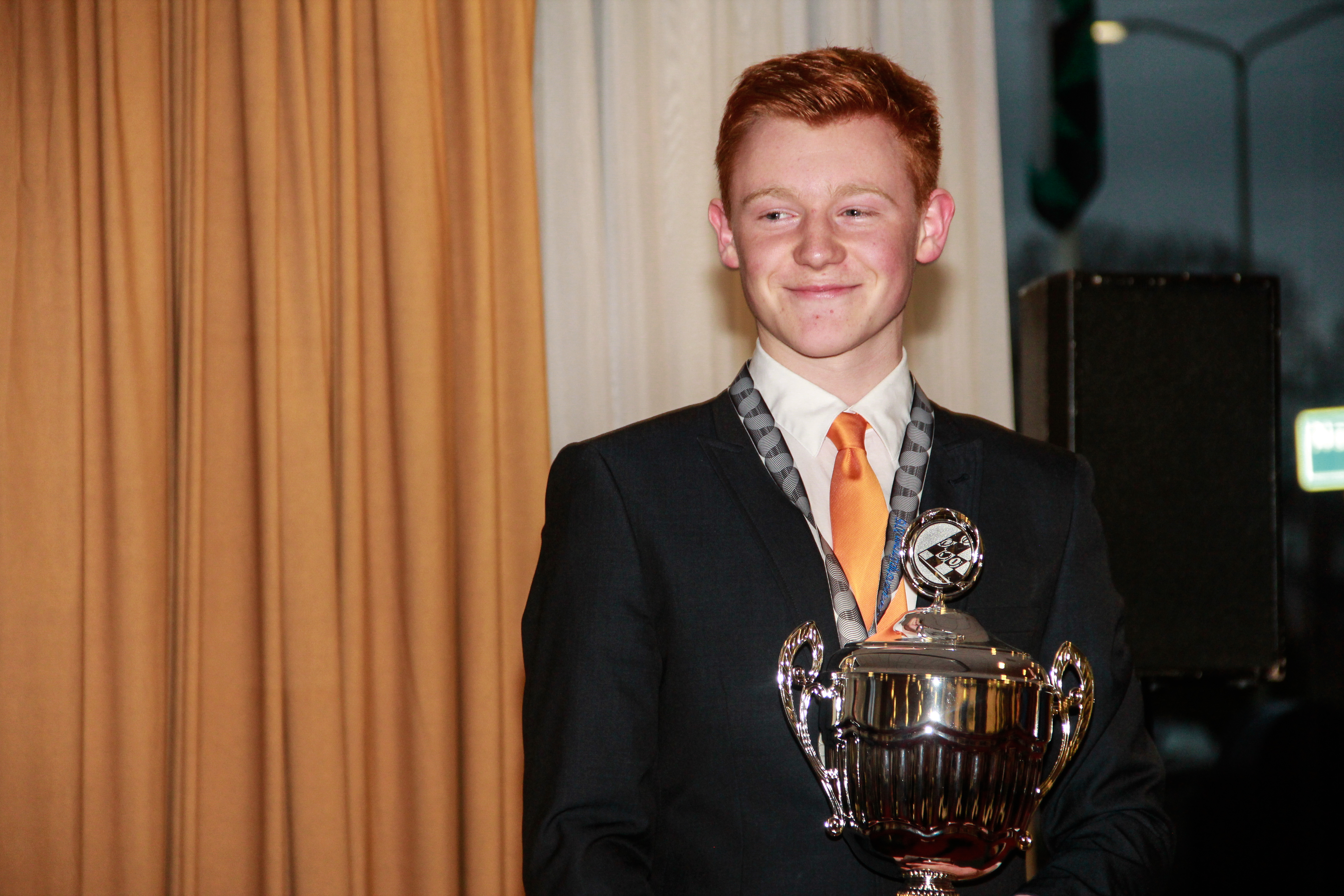
- 2025 World Draughts Champion Jan Groenendijk

Tournament information
- Location: Yaoundé, Cameroon
- Dates: 6 June–23 June
- Administrator: FMJD
- Tournament format: Round-robin tournament
- Venue: Yaoundé Multipurpose Sports Complex

Final positions
- Champion: Jan Groenendijk
- Runner-up: Jitse Slump

The 2025 World Draughts Championship in international draughts was held from 6 to 23 June, 2025 at the Yaoundé Multipurpose Sports Complex in Yaoundé, Cameroon. It was held under the auspices of the International Draughts Federation (FMJD). Forty players competed in the tournament. In the first stage, all players were divided into four groups. The best three players from each group advanced to the final. All stages were played as a round-robin tournament. The main referee was Bartosz Socha. The total prize money for the tournament was 25,000 euros.

Jan Groenendijk from the Netherlands won his second title.

== Rules and regulations ==
The games were played with the official FMJD classical time control: 90 minutes for 45 moves, followed by 30 minutes for the rest of the game plus a 30-second increment per move. FMJD regulations prohibited players from agreeing to a draw before each had completed 40 moves; doing so required the referee to award both players 0 points.

The final rankings were determined by total points. If two or more players finished with the same score, the following tiebreaks were applied:

1. Number of wins.
2. Results in the direct encounters between the tied players.
3. Results obtained against opponents in order of their final ranking.

For places 1–3, tiebreaks using the Lehmann–Georgiev system (15 minutes plus a 2-second increment per move for an unlimited number of games) were played if necessary; other places were shared.

== Participants ==
Number	Name	Country	Rating
1	Jan Groenendijk	Netherlands	2442
2	Jitse Slump	Netherlands	2409
3	Guntis Valneris	Latvia	2404
4	Martijn van IJzendoorn	Netherlands	2384
5	Wouter Sipma	Netherlands	2372
6	Cesar Mouanda	Republic of the Congo	2363
7	Joel Atse	Ivory Coast	2352
8	Martin Dolfing	Netherlands	2344
9	Jean Marc Ndjofang	Cameroon	2338
10	Kees Thijssen	Netherlands	2337
11	Tardorel Itoua	Republic of the Congo	2335
12	Mukendi Reagan Lutete	Democratic Republic of the Congo	2317
13	Leopold Kouogueu Kouomou	Cameroon	2314
14	Aleksej Domchev	Lithuania	2309
15	Thomy Lucien Mbongo	France	2306
16	Jan van Dijk	Netherlands	2301
17	Landry Nga	Cameroon	2298
18	Edvardas Bužinskis	Lithuania	2291
19	Simon Harmsma	Netherlands	2286
20	Hein Meijer	Netherlands	2285
21	Alessio Scaggiante	Italy	2284
22	Wouter Ludwig	Netherlands	2274
23	Moussa Diallo	Mali	2273
24	Raimonds Vipulis	Latvia	2258
25	Ron Heusdens	Netherlands	2258
26	Jos Stokkel	Netherlands	2239
27	Kombila Arnauld Mamboundou	Gabon	2236
28	Emre Hageman	Netherlands	2223
29	Alain Fezeu	Cameroon	2221
30	Frantz Forbin	Guadeloupe	2200
31	Maxime Ilboudo	Burkina Faso	2193
32	Arnaud Foto	Cameroon	2192
33	Gerard Ngankou	Cameroon	2187
34	Maksym Opryshchenko	Ukraine	2166
35	Sayouba Kiema	Burkina Faso	2166
36	Jean Lou Praud	France	2145
37	Bohdan Panchenkov	Ukraine	2106
38	Andre Stephane Meeh	Cameroon	2021
39	Boris Kamdem	Cameroon	
40	Aristo Bonguen	Cameroon	

== Results ==
=== Semifinal ===
Advanced to the final

==== Group A ====
Place	Name	Country	Title	Rating	1	2	3	4	5	6	7	8	9	10	Points	Wins	Draws	Losses
1.	Jan Groenendijk	Netherlands	GMI	2442	*	1	1	1	1	1	2	2	2	2	13	4	5	0
2.	Ron Heusdens	Netherlands	GMI	2258	1	*	1	1	1	2	1	1	1	2	11	2	7	0
3.	Martin Dolfing	Netherlands	GMI	2344	1	1	*	1	1	1	1	2	2	1	11	2	7	0
4.	Edvardas Bužinskis	Lithuania	GMI	2291	1	1	1	*	1	1	1	2	1	2	11	2	7	0
5.	Jean Marc Ndjofang	Cameroon	GMI	2338	1	1	1	1	*	1	1	1	2	2	11	2	7	0
6.	Thomy Lucien Mbongo	France	MI	2306	1	0	1	1	1	*	1	2	1	2	10	2	6	1
7.	Raimonds Vipulis	Latvia	GMI	2258	0	1	1	1	1	1	*	1	1	2	9	1	7	1
8.	Aristo Bonguen	Cameroon			0	1	0	0	1	0	1	*	1	2	6	1	4	4
9.	Arnaud Foto	Cameroon		2192	0	1	0	1	0	1	1	1	*	1	6	0	6	3
10.	Maksym Opryshchenko	Ukraine	MF	2166	0	0	1	0	0	0	0	0	1	*	2	0	2	7

==== Group B ====
Place	Name	Country	Title	Rating	1	2	3	4	5	6	7	8	9	10	Points	Wins	Draws	Losses
1.	Kees Thijssen	Netherlands	GMI	2337	*	1	1	2	1	2	1	1	2	1	12	3	6	0
2.	Joel Atse	Ivory Coast	GMI	2352	1	*	1	1	2	1	1	1	2	2	12	3	6	0
3.	Jitse Slump	Netherlands	GMI	2409	1	1	*	1	2	1	1	2	1	1	11	2	7	0
4.	Landry Nga	Cameroon		2298	0	1	1	*	1	2	1	1	1	1	9	1	7	1
5.	Maxime Ilboudo	Burkina Faso		2193	1	0	0	1	*	2	1	1	0	2	8	2	4	3
6.	Bohdan Panchenkov	Ukraine		2106	0	1	1	0	0	*	2	1	2	1	8	2	4	3
7.	Gerard Ngankou	Cameroon		2187	1	1	1	1	1	0	*	1	1	1	8	0	8	1
8.	Aleksej Domchev	Lithuania	GMI	2309	1	1	1	0	1	1	1	*	1	1	8	0	8	1
9.	Moussa Diallo	Mali		2273	0	0	1	1	2	0	1	1	*	1	7	1	5	3
10.	Jos Stokkel	Netherlands	GMI	2239	1	0	1	1	0	1	1	1	1	*	7	0	7	2

==== Group C ====
Place	Name	Country	Title	Rating	1	2	3	4	5	6	7	8	9	10	Points	Wins	Draws	Losses
1.	Wouter Sipma	Netherlands	GMI	2372	*	1	2	1	2	2	2	1	2	1	14	5	4	0
2.	Guntis Valneris	Latvia	GMI	2404	1	*	1	0	1	1	2	2	2	1	11	3	5	1
3.	Simon Harmsma	Netherlands	MI	2286	0	1	*	2	1	1	1	1	2	2	11	3	5	1
4.	Jan van Dijk	Netherlands	MI	2301	1	2	0	*	2	0	0	1	2	2	10	4	2	3
5.	Alain Fezeu	Cameroon		2221	0	1	1	0	*	1	2	2	2	1	10	3	4	2
6.	Tardorel Itoua	Republic of the Congo	GMI	2335	0	1	1	2	1	*	1	1	1	1	9	1	7	1
7.	Alessio Scaggiante	Italy	MI	2284	0	0	1	2	0	1	*	1	1	2	8	2	4	3
8.	Boris Kamdem	Cameroon			1	0	1	1	0	1	1	*	1	1	7	0	7	2
9.	Kombila Arnauld Mamboundou	Gabon		2236	0	0	0	0	0	1	1	1	*	2	5	1	3	5
10.	Sayouba Kiema	Burkina Faso	MF	2166	1	1	0	0	1	1	0	1	0	*	5	0	5	4

==== Group D ====
Place	Name	Country	Title	Rating	1	2	3	4	5	6	7	8	9	10	Points	Wins	Draws	Losses
1.	Mukendi Reagan Lutete	Democratic Republic of the Congo	GMI	2317	*	1	1	1	1	1	2	2	1	2	12	3	6	0
2.	Martijn van IJzendoorn	Netherlands	GMI	2384	1	*	1	1	1	1	1	2	2	2	12	3	6	0
3.	Emre Hageman	Netherlands	MI	2223	1	1	*	2	1	1	1	1	1	2	11	2	7	0
4.	Cesar Mouanda	Republic of the Congo		2363	1	1	0	*	1	1	2	1	1	1	9	1	7	1
5.	Wouter Ludwig	Netherlands	MI	2274	1	1	1	1	*	1	1	1	1	1	9	0	9	0
5.	Hein Meijer	Netherlands	GMI	2285	1	1	1	1	1	*	1	1	1	1	9	0	9	0
7.	Leopold Kouogueu Kouomou	Cameroon	GMI	2314	0	1	1	0	1	1	*	2	1	1	8	1	6	2
8.	Andre Stephane Meeh	Cameroon		2021	0	0	1	1	1	1	0	*	2	1	7	1	4	3
9.	Frantz Forbin	Guadeloupe	MI	2200	1	0	1	1	1	1	1	0	*	1	7	0	7	2
10.	Jean Lou Praud	France	MF	2145	0	0	0	1	1	1	1	1	1	*	6	0	6	3

=== Final ===
Place	Name	Country	Title	Rating	1	2	3	4	5	6	7	8	9	10	11	12	Points	Wins	Draws	Losses
1.	Jan Groenendijk	Netherlands	GMI	2442	*	1	1	1	2	1	1	1	1	1	2	1	13	2	9	0
2.	Jitse Slump	Netherlands	GMI	2409	1	*	1	1	1	1	2	1	1	1	1	2	13	2	9	0
3.	Guntis Valneris	Latvia	GMI	2404	1	1	*	1	1	1	1	1	1	2	1	1	12	1	10	0
3.	Martijn van IJzendoorn	Netherlands	GMI	2384	1	1	1	*	1	1	1	1	1	2	1	1	12	1	10	0
5.	Joel Atse	Ivory Coast	GMI	2352	0	1	1	1	*	1	1	2	1	1	1	1	11	1	9	1
6.	Kees Thijssen	Netherlands	GMI	2337	1	1	1	1	1	*	1	1	1	0	1	2	11	1	9	1
7.	Wouter Sipma	Netherlands	GMI	2372	1	0	1	1	1	1	*	1	1	1	1	2	11	1	9	1
8.	Martin Dolfing	Netherlands	GMI	2344	1	1	1	1	0	1	1	*	1	1	2	1	11	1	9	1
9.	Mukendi Reagan Lutete	Democratic Republic of the Congo	GMI	2317	1	1	1	1	1	1	1	1	*	1	1	1	11	0	11	0
10.	Ron Heusdens	Netherlands	GMI	2258	1	1	1	0	0	1	2	1	1	*	1	1	10	1	8	2
11.	Emre Hageman	Netherlands	MI	2223	0	1	1	1	1	1	1	0	1	1	*	1	9	0	9	2
12.	Simon Harmsma	Netherlands	MI	2286	1	0	1	1	1	0	0	1	1	1	1	*	8	0	8	3

=== Additional match for 3rd place ===
Place	Name	Country	Rating FMJD	1	2	3	4	5	6	7	8	9
3	Guntis Valneris	Latvia	2404	1	1	1	1	1	1	1	1	2
4	Martijn van IJzendoorn	Netherlands	2384	1	1	1	1	1	1	1	1	0

== Final standings ==
Place	Name	Country
1	Jan Groenendijk	Netherlands
2	Jitse Slump	Netherlands
3	Guntis Valneris	Latvia
4	Martijn van IJzendoorn	Netherlands
5	Joel Atse	Ivory Coast
6	Kees Thijssen	Netherlands
7	Wouter Sipma	Netherlands
8	Martin Dolfing	Netherlands
9	Mukendi Reagan Lutete	Democratic Republic of the Congo
10	Ron Heusdens	Netherlands
11	Emre Hageman	Netherlands
12	Simon Harmsma	Netherlands
13	Edvardas Bužinskis	Lithuania
14	Jan van Dijk	Netherlands
15	Cesar Mouanda	Republic of the Congo
15	Landry Nga	Cameroon
17	Jean Marc Ndjofang	Cameroon
18	Alain Fezeu	Cameroon
19	Hein Meijer	Netherlands
19	Wouter Ludwig	Netherlands
21	Maxime Ilboudo	Burkina Faso
22	Thomy Lucien Mbongo	France
23	Tardorel Itoua	Republic of the Congo
24	Bohdan Panchenkov	Ukraine
25	Raimonds Vipulis	Latvia
26	Alessio Scaggiante	Italy
27	Leopold Kouogueu Kouomou	Cameroon
28	Gerard Ngankou	Cameroon
29	Aleksej Domchev	Lithuania
30	Andre Stephane Meeh	Cameroon
31	Boris Kamdem	Cameroon
32	Aristo Bonguen	Cameroon
33	Moussa Diallo	Mali
34	Frantz Forbin	Guadeloupe
35	Arnaud Foto	Cameroon
36	Kombila Arnauld Mamboundou	Gabon
37	Jos Stokkel	Netherlands
38	Jean Lou Praud	France
39	Sayouba Kiema	Burkina Faso
40	Maksym Opryshchenko	Ukraine
