= Martijn van IJzendoorn =

Dutch draughts grandmaster (born 1997)

Personal information
- Born: 24 March 1997 (age 29) Wateringen, Netherlands

Sport
- Country: Netherlands
- Sport: Draughts
- Rank: Grandmaster (2017)

Achievements and titles
- Highest world ranking: No. 4 (January 2022)
- Personal best: 2401 (April 2024, rating)

Martijn van IJzendoorn (born 24 March 1997) is a Dutch draughts grandmaster.

== Career ==
In 2016, he won the bronze medal in the European Draughts Championships.

In 2017, he won the RotterDamsOpen tournament and the Dutch Draughts Championship.

In 2018, he won the bronze medal in the European Draughts Championships.

In December 2021, he won the silver medal in the World Blitz Draughts Championship.

In July 2022, he won the silver medal in the World Blitz Draughts Championship.

In September 2023, he achieved a new world record in simultaneous exhibition by playing against 50 opponents and achieving an 88% score overall.

In October 2023, he won the bronze medal at the 2023 World Draughts Championship, later also winning the silver medal in the rapid section.

In June 2025, he finished in fourth place at the 2025 World Draughts Championship, narrowly losing the bronze medal to Guntis Valneris.
