= Jutta =

Female given name

- Pronunciation: German: [ˈjʊta]
- Language: German

Origin
- Meaning: "Mankind, child, descendant"

Other names
- Variant forms: Judith, Eutha, Henrietta

The feminine name Jutta (pronounced "yutta") is the German form of Judith. There is also an alternative theory that it could be derived from the Germanic name Eutha, meaning "mankind, child, descendant", or from a short form of Henrietta.

== People ==
- Jutta Abromeit, East German rower
- Jutta Allmendinger, German sociologist
- Jutta Appelt, German politician and writer
- Jutta Balster, German volleyball player
- Jutta Bauer, German writer and illustrator
- Jutta Behrendt, German competition rower
- Jutta Bojsen-Møller, Danish women’s rights activist and a member of the Danish Women's Society
- Jutta Bornemann, Austrian actor, screenwriter and author
- Jutta Braband, German politician
- Jutta Brückner, German film director, screenwriter and film producer
- Jutta Burggraf (1952–2010), German Catholic theologian
- Jutta Deutschland, German ballerina and choreographer
- Jutta Ditfurth (born 1951), German sociologist
- Jutta Freybe, German actress
- Jutta Gebert, Austrian rally co-driver
- Jutta Götzmann (born 1965), German art historian
- Jutta Haug (born 1951), German politician
- Jutta Heine, German sprinter
- Jutta Hempel, German chess player
- Jutta Hering, German film editor
- Jutta Hering-Winckler, German lawyer and patron of music
- Jutta Hipp (1925–2003), German-American jazz pianist and composer
- Jutta Hoffmann (born 1941), German actress
- Jutta Höhne, German fencer
- Jutta Irmscher, German skydiver
- Jutta Jokiranta (born 1971), Finnish theologian
- Jutta Jol, German actress
- Jutta Kirst, East German high jumper
- Jutta Kleinschmidt, German rally driver
- Jutta Koether (born 1958), German artist, musician and critic
- Jutta Krüger, German athlete
- Jutta Kulmsee, German noblewoman, mystic and saint
- Jutta Kunz, German physicist
- Jutta Lampe, German actress
- Jutta Langenau, German swimmer
- Jutta Lau (born 1955), German rower
- Jutta Leerdam (born 1998), Dutch speed skater
- Jutta Lehtinen (born 1983), Finnish actress
- Jutta Limbach, German jurist and politician (SPD)
- Jutta Meischner, German classical archaeologist
- Jutta Müller, German figure skater and figure skating coaches worldwide
- Jutta Nardenbach (1968–2018), German international footballer
- Jutta Niehaus, German racing cyclist
- Jutta Oesterle-Schwerin, German politician
- Jutta of Bohemia, second daughter of King John of Bohemia, and his first wife, Elisabeth of Bohemia
- Jutta of Denmark, daughter of Eric IV of Denmark and his wife Jutta of Saxony
- Jutta of Saxony (c. 1223 – before 2 February 1267), Danish Queen consort
- Jutta of Thuringia, eldest daughter of Landgrave Hermann I of Thuringia and his first wife, Sophia of Sommerschenburg, a daughter of Fredrick II of Sommerschenburg
- Jutta Oltersdorf, German gymnast
- Jutta Ploch (born 1960), East German rower
- Jutta Poikolainen (born 1963), Finnish archer
- Jutta Rabe, German journalist
- Jutta Resch-Treuwerth, German journalist and author
- Jutta Richter, German writer
- Jutta Rüdiger, German psychologist
- Jutta Schmitt-Lang (born 1982), German politician
- Jutta Seppinen (born 1976), Finnish conductor and mezzo-soprano
- Jutta Sika (1877–1964), Austrian graphic designer and artist
- Jutta Speidel (born 1954), German actress
- Jutta Steinruck, German politician
- Jutta Steinruck (born 1962), German politician
- Jutta Stöck, German athletics competitor
- Jutta Treviranus, Canadian academic
- Jutta Urpilainen (born 1975), Finnish politician
- Jutta Vialon, German photographer
- Duchess Jutta of Mecklenburg-Strelitz (1880–1946), Crown Princess of Montenegro
- Jutta von Sponheim (1091–1136), noblewoman
- Jutta Wachowiak, German actress
- Jutta Wanke, German swimmer
- Jutta Weber (born 1954), German swimmer
- Jutta Zilliacus (1925–2026), Finnish-Estonian journalist, author and politician
