= Pikker (disambiguation) =

Pikker may refer to:

- Pikne, Estonian pagan god of lightning
- Pikker (magazine), Estonian magazine of satire and humor
- Augusts Pikker, Russian Empire/Estonian Olympic wrestler
- Pikker, birth name of Aleksandr Samoylovich Martynov, Russian revolutionary
- Pikker (gunboat)
