= 2013 Women's World Draughts Championship =

Draughts tournament

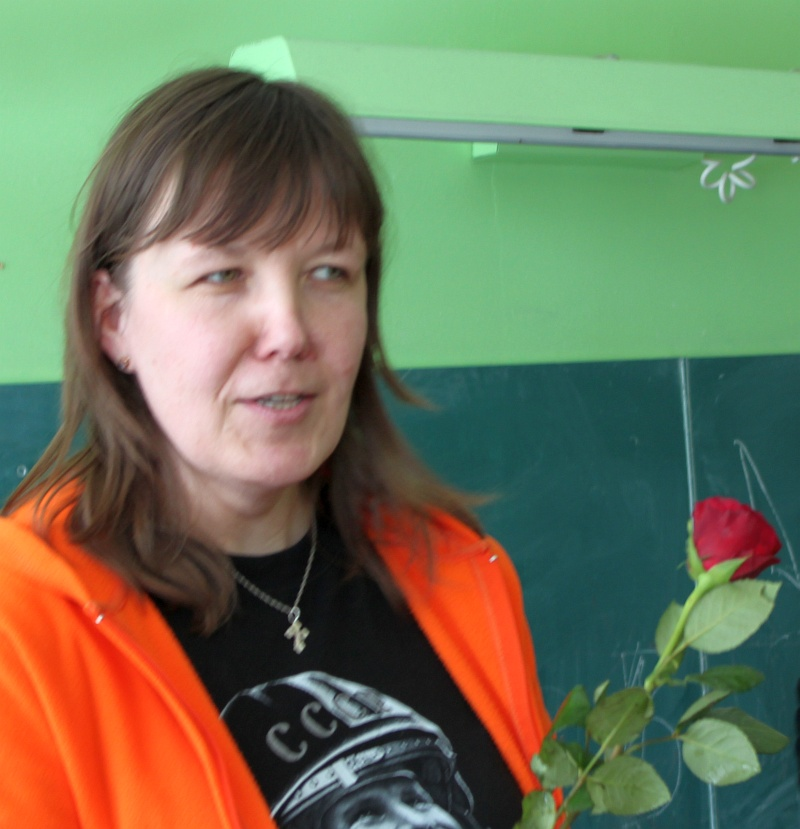
- 2013 Women's World Draughts Champion Zoja Golubeva

Tournament information
- Location: Ulaanbaatar, Mongolia
- Dates: 4 October–15 October
- Administrator: FMJD
- Tournament format: Round-robin tournament

Final positions
- Champion: Zoja Golubeva
- Runner-up: Darya Tkachenko

The 2013 Women's World Draughts Championship was an international draughts tournament held in Ulaanbaatar, Mongolia. The championship was played as a 15-round round-robin tournament, which ran from 4–15 October, 2013. The arbiter was Rima Danileviciene (Lithuania).

== Competition ==
The competition featured 16 players from 10 countries. The players in the tournament were Viktoriya Motrichko, Erdenetsogt Mandakhnaran, Odgejrel Molomjamts, Nyamjargal Numkhbaatar, Laima Adlyte, Darya Tkachenko, Alatenghua, Matrena Nogovitsyna, Ayyyna Sobakina, Heike Verheul, Zoja Golubeva, Tamara Tansykkuzhina, Hanqing Zhao, Olga Fedorovich, Piret Viirma, and Natalia Sadowska. The tournament ended with Zoja Golubeva coming in first place, having won a total of eight games. Darya Tkachenko came in second place with a total of seven wins.

Place	Name	Country	Title	Rating	1	2	3	4	5	6	7	8	9	10	11	12	3	14	15	16	Points	Wins	Draws	Losses
1	Zoja Golubeva	Latvia	GMIF	2359	*	1	1	2	1	2	1	1	2	2	2	2	1	2	0	2	22	8	6	1
2	Darya Tkachenko	Ukraine	GMIF	2307	1	*	0	1	1	2	1	2	2	2	1	2	1	1	2	2	21	7	7	1
3	Tamara Tansykkuzhina	Russia	GMIF	2306	1	2	*	1	0	1	1	1	1	2	2	1	2	1	2	2	20	6	8	1
4	Viktoriya Motrichko	Ukraine	GMIF	2263	0	1	1	*	2	1	1	1	1	1	2	1	2	2	2	1	19	5	9	1
5	Olga Fedorovich	Belarus	GMIF	2278	1	1	2	0	*	2	0	0	1	1	1	2	2	2	1	2	18	6	6	3
6	Alatenghua	China		2070	0	0	1	1	0	*	2	1	1	2	2	2	2	1	1	1	17	5	7	3
7	Matrena Nogovitsyna	Russia	GMIF	2276	1	1	1	1	2	0	*	1	1	1	1	0	1	2	2	2	17	4	9	2
8	Natalia Sadowska	Poland	MIF	2261	1	0	1	1	2	1	1	*	1	1	1	1	1	1	1	2	16	2	12	1
9	Ayyyna Sobakina	Russia	MIF	2214	0	0	1	1	1	1	1	1	*	1	1	1	1	2	2	1	15	2	11	2
10	Heike Verheul	Netherlands	MIF	2180	0	0	0	1	1	0	1	1	1	*	1	1	1	2	2	2	14	3	8	4
11	Laima Adlytė	Lithuania	MIF	2228	0	1	0	0	1	0	1	1	1	1	*	1	1	2	2	1	13	2	9	4
12	Hanqing Zhao	China	MIF	2123	0	0	1	1	0	0	2	1	1	1	1	*	2	1	1	1	13	2	9	4
13	Erdenetsogt Mandakhnaran	Mongolia	GMIF	2199	1	1	0	0	0	0	1	1	1	1	1	0	*	1	2	2	12	2	8	5
14	Nyamjargal Munkhbaatar	Mongolia	GMIF	2263	0	1	1	0	0	1	0	1	0	0	0	1	1	*	2	1	9	1	7	7
15	Odgerel Molomjamts	Mongolia		2100	2	0	0	0	1	1	0	1	0	0	0	1	0	0	*	1	7	1	5	9
16	Piret Viirma	Estonia	MFF	2145	0	0	0	1	0	1	0	0	1	0	1	1	0	1	1	*	7	0	7	8

== Rapid and blitz ==
On 2 October, the women's world championship in blitz took place. The tournament was played as a 9-round Swiss-system tournament with a time control of 5 minutes plus a 3-second increment per move. The tournament featured 22 players from 8 countries. Matrena Nogovitsyna came in first place, Viktoriya Motrichko in second place and Darya Tkachenko in third place.

On 3 October, the women's world championship in rapid took place. The tournament was played as a 7-round Swiss-system tournament with a time control of 15 minutes plus a 3-second increment per move. The tournament featured 22 players from 6 countries. Darya Tkachenko came in first place, Viktoriya Motrichko in second place and Natalia Sadowska in third place.

== See also ==
- List of women's Draughts World Championship winners
- Women's World Draughts Championship
- Mongolian draughts
