= List of theatres in Estonia =

This is the list of theatres located in Estonia. The list is incomplete.

Name	Location (city)	Existing years	Further info	Image
Emajõe Summer Theatre	Tartu	1996		
Endla Theatre	Pärnu			
Estonia	Tallinn			
Estonian Drama Theatre	Tallinn			
Fine 5 Dance Theatre	Tallinn			
Ilmarine	Narva	1989-		
Kanuti Guild Hall	Tallinn			
Kinoteater	Tallinn	2011–		
Kuressaare Town Theatre	Kuressaare			
Labyrinth Theatre Group G9	Tallinn?			
Narva Theatre	Narva			
NUKU Theatre	Tallinn			
Piip and Tuut Theatre	Tallinn			
Polygon Theatre and Theatre School				
R.A.A.A.M.				
Rakvere Theatre	Rakvere			
Russian Drama Theatre of Estonia	Tallinn			
South Estonian Theatre	Valga/Võru	1948–1951		
Sõltumatu Tantsu Lava	Tallinn			
Tallinn City Theatre	Tallinn			
Tallinn Dance Theatre	Tallinn			
Tallinna Töölisteater	Tallinn	1926–1944		
Tartu New Theatre	Tartu			
Theatre NO99	Tallinn			
Theatrum	Tallinn	1994		
Ugala	Viljandi			
VABA LAVA (Open Space)	Tallinn			
Vanalinnastuudio	Tallinn	1980-2004		
Vanemuine	Tartu			
VAT Theatre				
Von Krahl Theatre	Tallinn			
