= Estonian mythology =

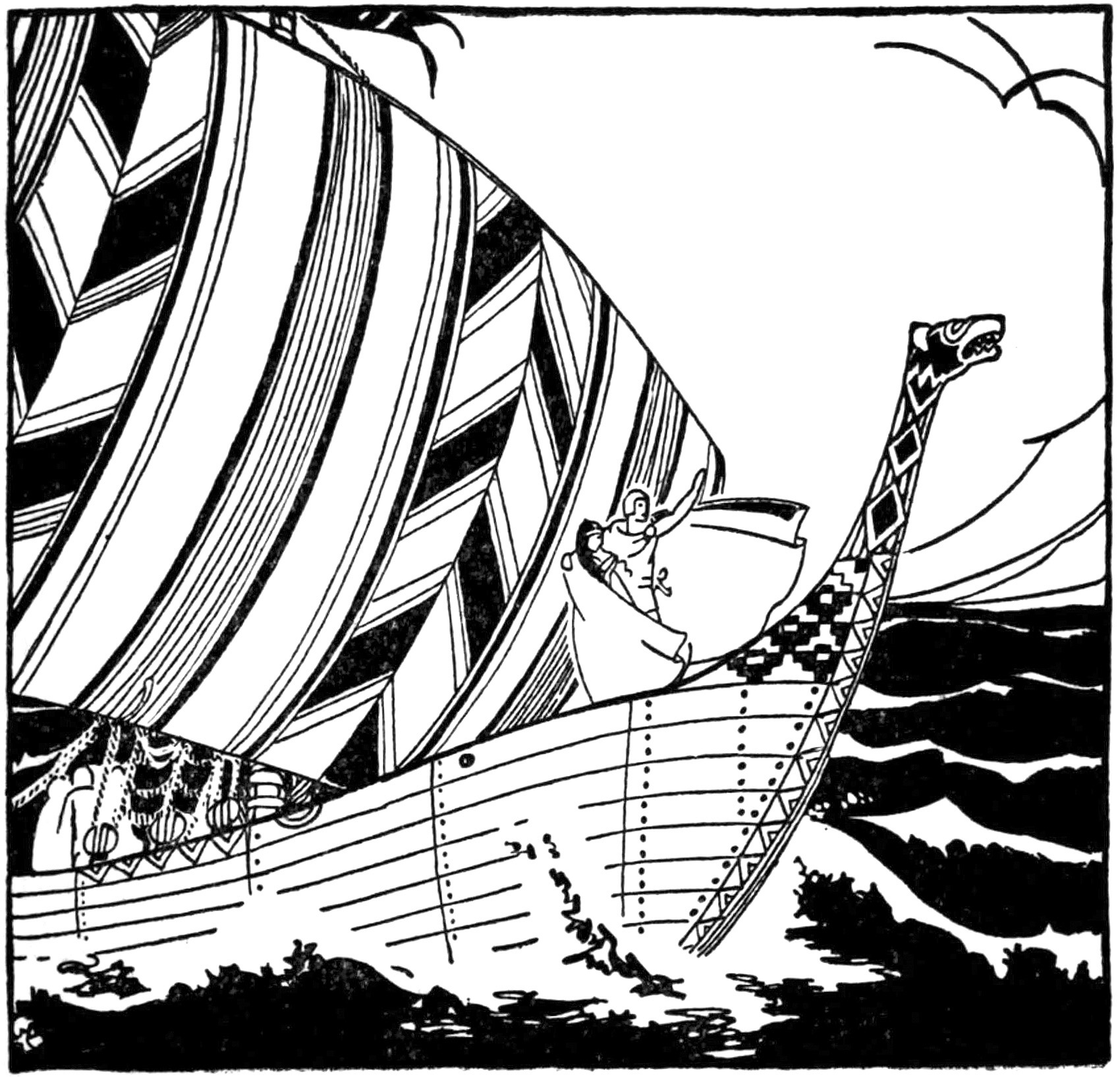
Illustration from Fairy tales from Baltic shores: Folk-lore stories from Estonia

Estonian mythology refers to myths belonging to the Estonian folk heritage and literary mythology. Information about the pre-Christian and medieval Estonian mythology is scattered in historical chronicles (which are mainly travellers' accounts), and in ecclesiastical registers. Systematic recordings of Estonian folklore started in the 19th century. Pre-Christian Estonian deities may have included a god known as Jumal or Taevataat ("Old man of the sky") in Estonian, corresponding to Jumala in Finnish, and Jumo in Mari.

== Background ==
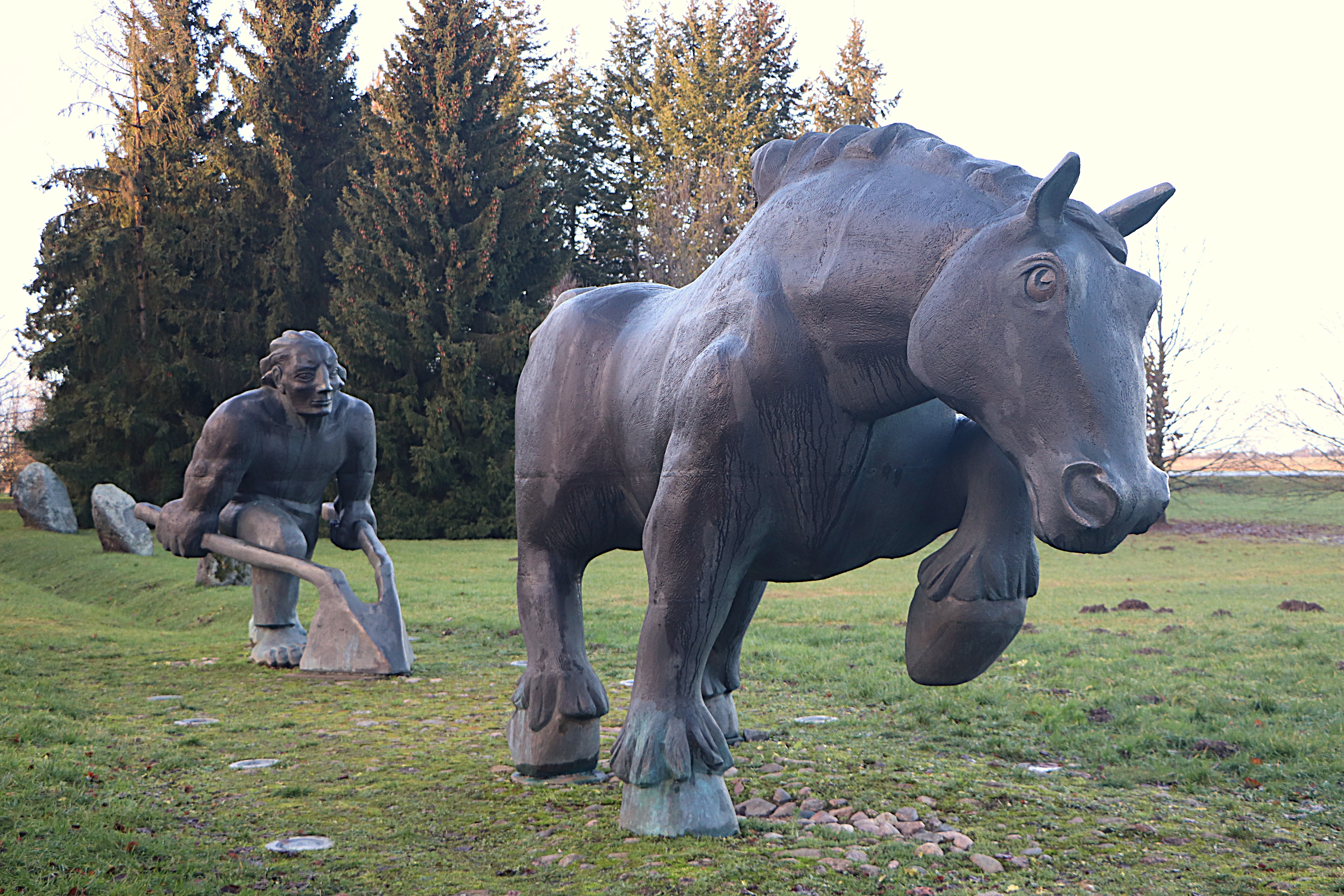
Sculpture of Kalevipoeg by Tauno Kangro

According to the Chronicle of Henry of Livonia in 1225 the Estonians disinterred the enemy's dead and burned them. It is thought that cremation was believed to speed up the dead person's journey to the afterlife and by cremation the dead would not become earthbound spirits which were thought to be dangerous to the living. He also described in his chronicle an Estonian legend originating in Virumaa about a mountain and a forest where a god named Tharapita, worshipped by Oeselians, was said to have been born.

The solstice festival of Midsummer (Estonian: Jaanipäev) celebrating the sun through solar symbols of bonfires is has been celebrated up until the present day and the mythology around the holiday features Estonian nature spirits such as the sacred oak and linden. The spirits were described by Balthasar Russow in 1578.

Some traces of the oldest authentic myths may have survived in runic songs. There is a song about the birth of the world in which a bird lays three eggs and starts to lay out the nestlings. One becomes Sun, one becomes Moon and one becomes the Earth. Other Baltic Finnic peoples also have myths according to which the world has emerged from an egg.

The world of the Estonians' ancestors is believed to have turned around a pillar or a tree, to which the skies were nailed with the North Star. The Milky Way (Linnutee or Birds' Way in Estonian) was a branch of the World tree (Ilmapuu) or the way by which birds moved (and took the souls of the deceased to the other world). These myths were based on animistic beliefs.

Changes occurred in proto-Estonian mythology as a result of the contacts with Baltic and Germanic tribes, as well as the transition from hunting and gathering to farming. Personifications of celestial bodies, sky and weather deities and fertility gods gained importance in the world of the farmers. There may have been a sky and thunder god called Uku or Ukko, also called Vanaisa (Grandfather) or Taevataat (Sky Father). Proto Estonian pre-Christian deities also may have included a sky-god by name Jumal, known also by other Finnic peoples as Jumala in Finnish and Jumo in Mari.

Estonian legends about giants (Kalevipoeg, Suur Tõll, Leiger) may be a reflection of Germanic (especially Scandinavian) influences. Giants themselves in some stories stood as protectors against such Germanic influences, such as invasion. There are numerous legends interpreting various natural objects and features as traces of Kalevipoeg's deeds. The giant has merged with Christian Devil, giving birth to a new character, Vanapagan (a cunning demon living on his farm or manor) and his farm hand Kaval-Ants ("Crafty Hans").

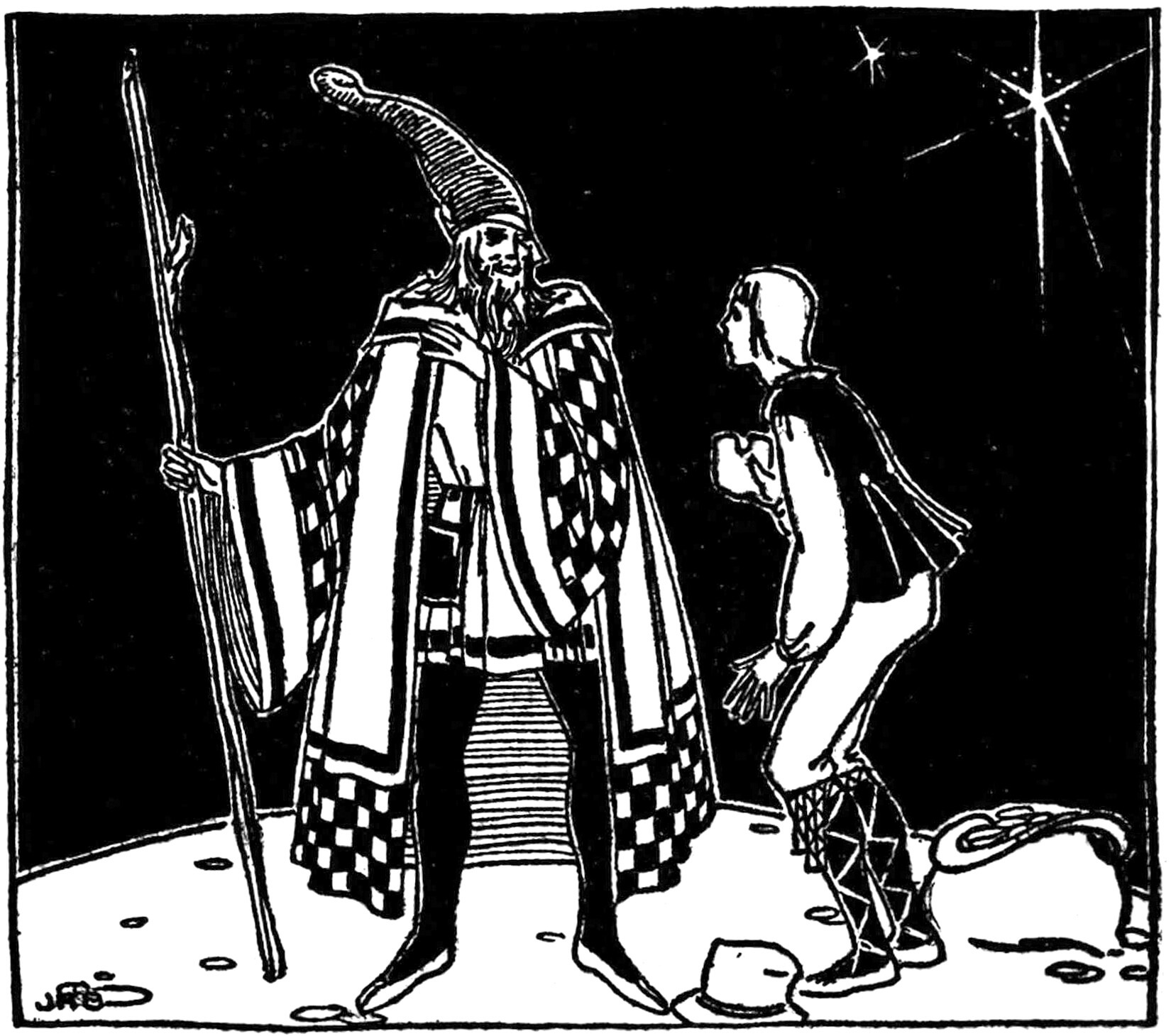
Fairy tales from Baltic shores p.126

It has been suggested by ethnologist and former president Lennart Meri (among others), that a Kaali meteorite which passed dramatically over populated regions and landed on the island of Saaremaa around 3,000–4,000 years ago was a cataclysmic event that may have influenced the mythology of Estonia and neighboring countries, especially those from whose vantage point a "sun" seemed to set in the east.

In the Finnish national epic, the Kalevala, cantos 47, 48 and 49 can be interpreted as descriptions of the impact, the resulting tsunami and devastating forest fires. It has also been suggested that the Virumaa-born Oeselian god Tharapita is a reflection of the meteorite that entered the atmosphere somewhere near the suggested "birthplace" of the god and landed in Oesel.

Motifs from Estonian runic songs include a mighty oak that grows into the sky before being felled and transformed into various objects, the Sun, Moon, and Star acting as suitors to a young maiden who ultimately accepts the Star, and a crafty blacksmith forging a woman of gold while remaining unable to grant her a soul or a mind. Other motifs involve a holy grove withering following desecration by a couple, a little brother successfully slaying a giant ox where mighty heroes failed, a woman being forced to kill her daughter who then ascends to heaven as an air maiden, a girl discovering a fish containing a woman, young girls being seduced at night by beings from the holy grove or the land of the dead, and a lake migrating to a new location after being desecrated.

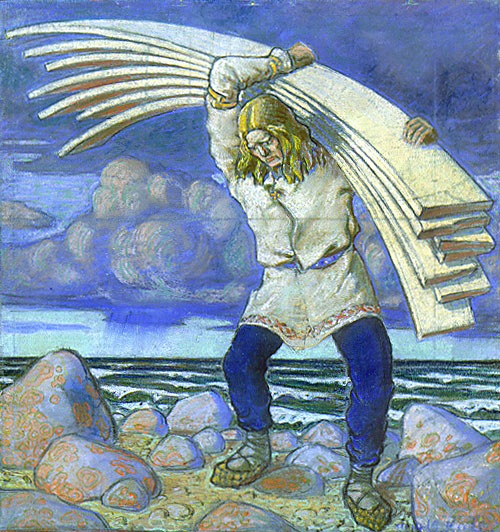
OKallis-Kalevipoeg

Some constructed elements are loans from Finnish mythology. Friedrich Robert Faehlmann and Friedrich Reinhold Kreutzwald compiled the Estonian national epic Kalevipoeg out of numerous prosaic folk legends and runic verse imitations that they themselves had written. Faehlmann also wrote eight fictional myths combining motives of Estonian folklore (from the legends and folk songs), Finnish mythology (from Ganander's "Mythologia Fennica") and classical Greek mythology. Matthias Johann Eisen was another folklorist and writer who studied folk legends and reworked them into literary form. Many of their contemporary scholars accepted this mythopoeia as authentic Estonian mythology.

During the era of Estonian national awakening the elements in the literary mythology were quickly and readily incorporated into contemporary popular culture through media and school textbooks. It can be difficult to tell how much of Estonian mythology as we know it today was actually constructed in the 19th and early 20th century. Faehlmann even noted in the beginning of his Esthnische Sagen (Estonian Legends) that:

"However, since Pietism has started to penetrate deep into the life of the people...[s]inging folk songs and telling legends have become forbidden for the people; moreover, the last survivals of pagan deities are being destroyed and there is no chance for historical research."

== Estonian mythological beings ==
=== Deities ===
The Estonian literary mythology describes a pantheon in which the supreme god, the god of all living things, is Taara. Taara is celebrated in sacred oak forests around Tartu. The god of thunder is Uku, whose daughters are Linda and Jutta, the queen of the birds, and whose sons are Kõu (Thunder) and Pikker (Lightning). Pikker possesses a powerful musical instrument that makes demons tremble and flee, and he has a naughty daughter named Ilmatütar (Weather Maiden). Folklore collected by Matthias Johann Eisen identifies Pikne as a son of Uku and brother of Kõu. Pikne served as protector of the holy river Võhandu in Võru County, punishing anyone who built mills there by withholding rain. This incident, along with the traditional prayer, was recorded by pastor Johann Gutslaff in his 1644 work Kurtzer Bericht und Unterricht Von der Falsch-heilig genandten Bäche in Lieffland Wöhhanda.

- Taara, also called Tharapita, Taarapita, Tarapita, the god of nature, and sometimes considered the supreme god
- Pikker (Äike), Thunder

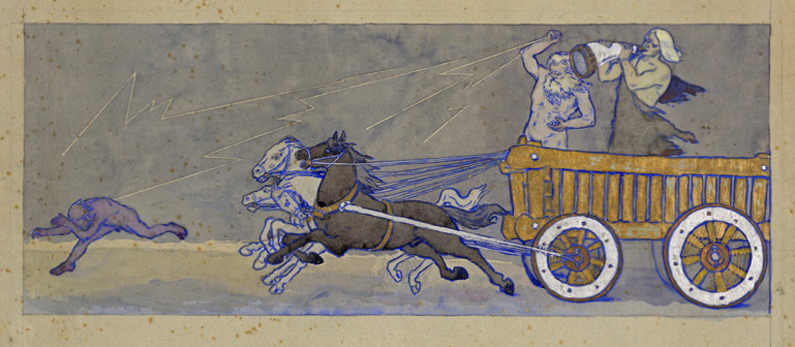
Pikker (Oskar Kallis, 1914)

- Jumal, the Estonian word for God
- Uku, the supreme god
- Taevataat, literally Sky Father, also called Vanaisa ("Grandfather")
- Kuu, the Moon
- Päike, the Sun
- Täht, the Star
- Koit, the personification of Dawn, a young man and lover of Hämarik
- Hämarik, the personification of dusk, a beautiful young maiden and lover of Koit
- Ehaema, Mother Twilight, a nocturnal spirit or elf, encouraging spinning
- Ilmaneitsi, also called Ilmatütar, is an Air Maiden or Sky Maiden
- Peko, Seto god of fertility and brewing
- Maaemä, Mother Earth
- Maajumalad, gods of Earth
- Metsik, a fertility god
- Rõugutaja, a female deity, protector of the rye crops and women in labor, deity protecting the city of Narva

=== Christian saints as deities ===
- Jüri (St George), god of agriculture
- Laurits (St Lawrence), god of fire
- Mart (St Martin), god of fertility
- Olev (St Olaf), mythical builder of St. Olaf's Church
- Tõnn (St Anthony), fertility god of the crops and pigs

=== Nature spirits ===
- Haldjas (the ruler), elf, fairy, protector spirit of some place, person, plant or animal
- Metsaema, the Mother of Forest
- Metsavana, the Old Man of the Forest
- Veteema, the Mother of Waters
- Vetevana, the Father of Waters
- Näkk, a shapeshifting water spirit
- Tuule-Emä, the Mother Wind
- Tuuleisa, Father Wind
- Tuulispask, Whirlwind
- Pakane, Frost
- Hiis, holy grove
- Majauss, literally meanas house snake, a domestic grass-snake and protector spirit
- Hoidja, a protector, keeper
- Kaitsja, a protector
- Peremees, literally familyman and means master or boss, traditionally the manor lord
- Murueit, a female spirit of forest and earth, connected to the land of the dead
- Murueide Tütred, the daughters of Murueit, beautiful maidens
- Ilo, the hostess of feasts and joy
- Järvevana, the Old Man from the Lake

=== Legendary figures ===
- Kalevipoeg, Kalevine, Sohni, Soini, Osmi, giant hero, mythical ancient king of Estonia
- Linda, mother of Kalevipoeg
- Suur Tõll, giant hero living in Saaremaa Island
- Piret, wife of Suur Tõll
- Leiger, a giant living in Hiiumaa island, younger brother of "Suur Tõll"
- Alevipoeg, Alev's son, a friend of Kalevipoeg
- Olevipoeg, a friend of Kalevipoeg, a city builder, related to Saint Olaf
- Sulevipoeg, Sulev's son, friend of Kalevipoeg
- Tietäjä, a wise man, shaman, or singer
- Ilmarine, Ilmasepp, a mythical blacksmith (cf. Ilmarinen)
- Giant, a giant
- Udres-Kudres, a serf, called "Son of the Sun", hero of folksongs

=== Spirits ===
- Toonela, also called Manala, land of the dead
- Tooni, god of death, ruler of the dead
- Vanapagan ("The Old Heathen"), Vanatühi, Vanakuri, Vanapoiss, Vanasarvik, Vanataat, The Devil
- Äiatar, a female demon, the Devil's daughter
- Kratt, also called Pisuhänd, Tulihänd, Hännamees, Puuk, a demon who stole and brought goods
- Ebajalg, demonic whirlwind
- Härjapõlvlane, leprechaun
- Eksitaja (Essütäjä), an evil spirit who makes people lose their way
- Kodukäija, a restless visitant ghost
- Libahunt, Sutekskäija, werewolf
- Liiva-Annus or Surm, Death
- Mana, a hypothetical ruler of the dead
- Manalane, inhabitant of the land of the dead
- Kalmuneiu, Maiden of the Grave

=== Other figures ===
- Jutta, queen of the birds, daughter of Taara
- Veehaldjas, spirit of the water, the weaver of a spring Ahjualune
- Kaval-Ants, translates to clever, crafty, or sly Hans, he is a farm hand who deceives Vanapagan
- Tuuslar, a sorcerer living in Finland
- Lapi nõid, witch of Lapland

=== Cosmology ===
- Kalm, a grave or spirit of a dead person, sometimes the ruler of the land of the dead
- Kääbas, a grave or death spirit
- Hingeliblikas, a person's spirit in the form of a moth
- Hingeloom, a person's spirit in the form of an insect or a small animal
- Hiiela, another world, land of the dead
- Hiieneitsid, maidens from the land of the dead
- Hall, personification of malaria
- Katk, personification of plague
- Külmking, a spirit of an unholy dead
- Luupainaja, Painaja, incubus, nightmare
- Maa-alune, a creature living under the earth
- Marras, spirit of death, predictor of death
- Koerakoonlane, a demonic warrior with a dog snout
- Peninukk, half-demonic warrior
- Pardiajaja, half-demonic warrior
- Tont, ghost
- Koll, also known as Kolumats, Kaevukoll, Mumm, bogey or bogeyman
- Juudaline, demon
- Põrguneitsi, literally: virgin of Hell
- Nõid, witch
- Lendva, an illness sent by an evil witch
- Hännamees, a demon who stole and brought food or money
- Varavedaja, loot carrier
- Varjuline, shadowling
- Mereveised, Sea cows
- Virmalised, Polar Lights
- Tallaja, trampler
- Tõnn, fairy, fertility god
- Lendva, an illness sent by an evil witch
- Hännamees, a demon who stole and brought food or money
- Varavedaja, loot carrier
- Varjuline, shadowling
- Mereveised, Sea cows
- Virmalised, Polar Lights
- Tallaja, trampler
- Tõnn, fairy, fertility god
- Vihelik, a spirit or being associated with the wind or quick movements, often appearing in folk songs
- Vilbus, a spirit or creature typically mentioned in the context of natural phenomena; it is sometimes associated with the rustling of grain or the shifting of the wind.
- Viruskundra, a domestic spirit. In Estonian tradition, children are told that when they lose a milk tooth
- Penn
- Rongo, protector of household wealth or specific agricultural tasks
- Rukkihunt, the "Rye Wolf," this is a spirit of the rye fields
- Salme, the sister of Linda (the mother of the hero Kalevipoeg)
- Tikutaja, a spirit associated with the snipe bird or spirits that make repetitive, rhythmic noises in nature
- Tulbigas, a mythical figure or spirit occasionally referenced in regional Estonian folklore, though it does not play a major role in the literary pantheon.
- Turis, a figure sometimes associated with the protection of cattle or the household

== Estonian mythical objects ==
- White Ship (valge laev), a mythical ship that brings freedom or takes people away to a better land, the myth was born around 1860 when a small sect led by Juhan Leinberg (also known as Prophet Maltsvet) gathered near Tallinn to wait for a white ship to take them away.
- Hat of fingernails (küüntest kübar), makes the bearer, usually Vanatühi) invisible
- Letter gloves (kirikindad), gloves with protective or magic powers, especially church letter gloves and the gloves that sailors wore, decorated with geometric patterns and narrow red stripes, the crafter used to sing while making to put spells in them
- Letter Belt (kirivöö), red woven belts and laces were a common item to sacrifice, tied to the branches of holy trees or around parts of the body that were sick and pulled tightly around the waist, worn to protect and give strength to the bearer
- Sacred stones, were erratics or unique stones often with holes in them, considered sacred, people came to them to sacrifice silver, blood, red ribbons and coins and ask for prosperity, according to paleoastronomer Heino Eelsalu they may have been used as calendars
- Travelling forests, these are sentient forests that relocate when people do evil things, most stories about travelling forests are found in coastal areas of Estonia.
