= Suur Tõll (film) =

1980 animated film directed by Rein Raamat

- Original Estonian poster.
- Directed by: Rein Raamat
- Written by: Rein Raamat
- Cinematography: Janno Põldma
- Edited by: Silvia Kiik
- Music by: Lepo Sumera
- Production company: Tallinnfilm
- Release dates: 4 January 1981 (Estonia); June 1982 (Latvia); 6 February 1989 (New York, USA)
- Running time: 14 minutes
- Countries: Estonia; Soviet Union
- Language: Estonian
- Budget: SUR 81,000

Suur Tõll (English: Toell the Great) is a 1980 Estonian animated short film created by Tallinnfilm. The film was directed by Rein Raamat, and the main artist was Jüri Arrak.

When it was first made, it was highly praised by Soviet animation directors. It had a short run within the country, but continued to be sent to international film festivals afterwards.

== Story ==
The film tells the story of the Estonian mythical hero, Suur Tõll, a giant said to have lived on the Baltic island of Saaremaa.

== Trivia ==
Clips from the film were used in folk metal band Metsatöll's music video for their song "Vaid Vaprust," from the album Äio.
