= The Dragon of the North =

Legendary Estonian character

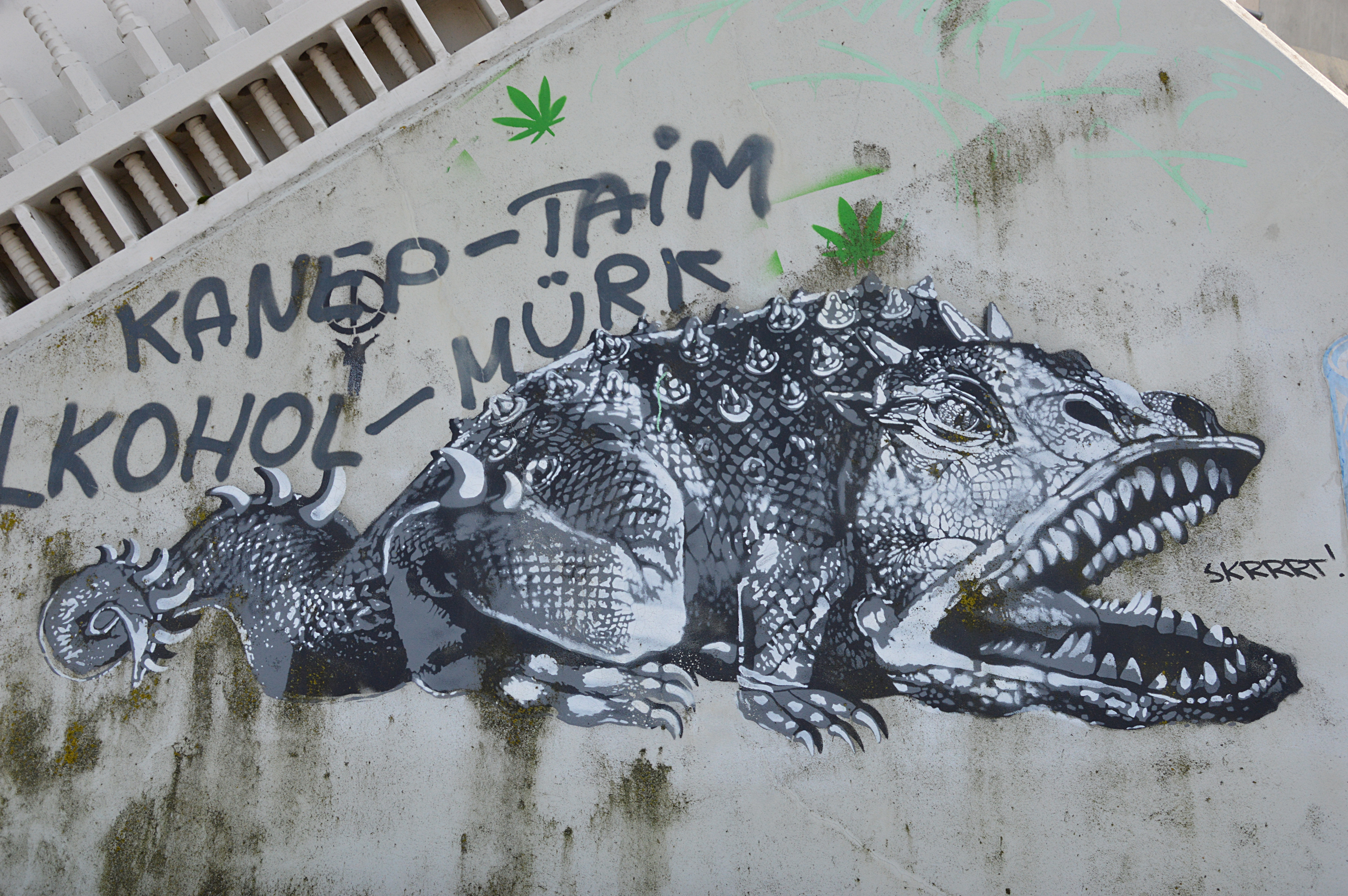
- A depiction of the Dragon of the North by Edward von Lõngus

Creature information
- Other name: Northern Frog
- Grouping: Monster
- Sub grouping: Dragon
- Similar entities: Dragonslayer, Tarasque, Lindworm, Tugarin Zmeyevich, Aži Dahāka, Zahāk, Gandarəβa
- Folklore: Estonian mythology

Origin
- First attested: 1866
- Country: Estonia
- Region: Finnic
- Habitat: The North

The Dragon of the North or Northern Frog (Estonian: Põhja konn) is a legendary frog-like creature in Estonian lore. The story was popularized by Friedrich Reinhold Kreutzwald in the collection Eesti rahva ennemuistsed jutud or Old Tales of the Estonian People (1866). It also gained international recognition when included in Andrew Lang and Leonora Blanche Lang's The Yellow Fairy Book (1894) under the title "The Dragon of the North."

The frog is described as a massive, dragon-like monster that wreaks havoc on the land until it is defeated. Modern interpretations, such as those by author Andrus Kivirähk and artist Navitrolla, often reimagine the frog as a protector of Estonian language and culture.

== Background ==
"Very long ago, as old people have told me, there lived a terrible monster, who came out of the North, and laid waste whole tracts of country, devouring both men and beasts; and this monster was so destructive that it was feared that unless help came, no living creature would be left on the face of the earth."

— "The Dragon of the North", 1864

"The beast had the body of an ox and the legs of a frog, two short ones in front and two long ones behind..."

"Metsalisel olnud härjavärki keha ja konnavärki jalad, ees kaks lühikest ja taga kaks pikka..."

— "The Northern Frog", 1866

"The frog's body was completely covered with scales, which were stronger than stone and iron, so that nothing could harm it. Its two large eyes shone night and day like the brightest candles..."

"Keha olnud konnal üleni soomustega kaetud, mis tugevamad kui kivi ja raud, nii et ükski asi temale viga ei võinud teha. Tema kaks suurt silma hiilanud öösel ja päeval kui heledamad küünlad..."

— "The Northern Frog", 1866

The frog appeared in "Põhja Konn" (literally "The Northern Frog") by Friedrich Reinhold Kreutzwald, which was published in his 1866 collection Eestirahwa Ennemuistesed jutud (Ancient Tales of the Estonian People). In it, Kreutzwald tells the story of a young man who acquires and uses a signet ring to defeat a monstrous beast. The German translation of Kreutzwald's work was used as the basis for the English translation in The Yellow Fairy Book.

Estonian scholar Risto Järv classifies the Northern Frog as a variant of a dragon-slayer (ATU 300) using the Aarne–Thompson–Uther Index, with the frog replacing the dragon and functioning as an oicotype, or a localized version of the archetype.

According to August Annist, in adapting a dragonslayer style of story to the Estonian context, Kreutzwald made the dragon frog-like.

== The Yellow Fairy Book ==
In the story recorded by Andrew Lang, the Dragon of the North (described as a frog-like chimera) is terrorizing a kingdom; it is notable for being indestructible to normal weaponry and for having hypnotic power, forcing people to throw themselves into its mouth if they were caught in the creature's gaze. The only thing able to kill it was the Ring of King Solomon, but this artifact had been lost.

A young man journeys to find the Ring and slay the Dragon of the North, and seeks out a magician, who tutors him in the speech of birds to learn where the Ring is. In return, the sage asks the young man to bring the Ring back to him, as he can interpret the magical inscriptions and tell what secrets the Ring possesses. The young man thanks him and promises to return.

Overhearing two birds in conversation, the young man learns that the Ring is currently in the possession of a beautiful Witch-Maiden. He comes to the spring where she bathes at night, where she discovers him and offers him to stay at her palace of silver and gold. Despite the Witch-Maiden's beauty and the comforts of her home, the young man is warned not to give in or accept the Witch's offers of marriage, as he will lose his soul if he accepts.

The young man gains the Witch-Maiden's confidence and she shows him the Ring of Solomon, the source of her incredible power, and explains how when it is placed on different fingers, it will grant different abilities to the wearer. Pretending not to believe her or understand how it works, he asks her to demonstrate, and she proceeds to show him the Ring's powers: while wearing it on different fingers, she can fly, become invulnerable to harm, turn invisible while wearing the Ring, manifest anything she wants, and finally gain the strength to smash boulders. The young man turns it into a game, and she hands him the Ring to try. He quickly uses it to become invisible and escape the Witch-Maiden.

The young man returns to the magician, who reads the Ring's inscription and learns how to kill the Dragon of the North. The young man follows the inscription and successfully slays the monster, afterwards rewarded by a king with the hand of the princess and half of the kingdom. However, the body of the Dragon of the North creates a horrible plague as it decays, and the young man sets out to the magician again for advice. Unfortunately, the Witch-Maiden, angry at being deceived, finds the young man and captures him, stripping him of the Ring of Solomon.

The princess, sensing something is wrong, has her father send for all the mages in the world to find her husband. By chance, the magician who had helped the young man in the past learns what happened, and with the King’s forces, he saves the young man and reunites him with the princess. However, the Ring of Solomon is lost once more.

== Cultural impact ==
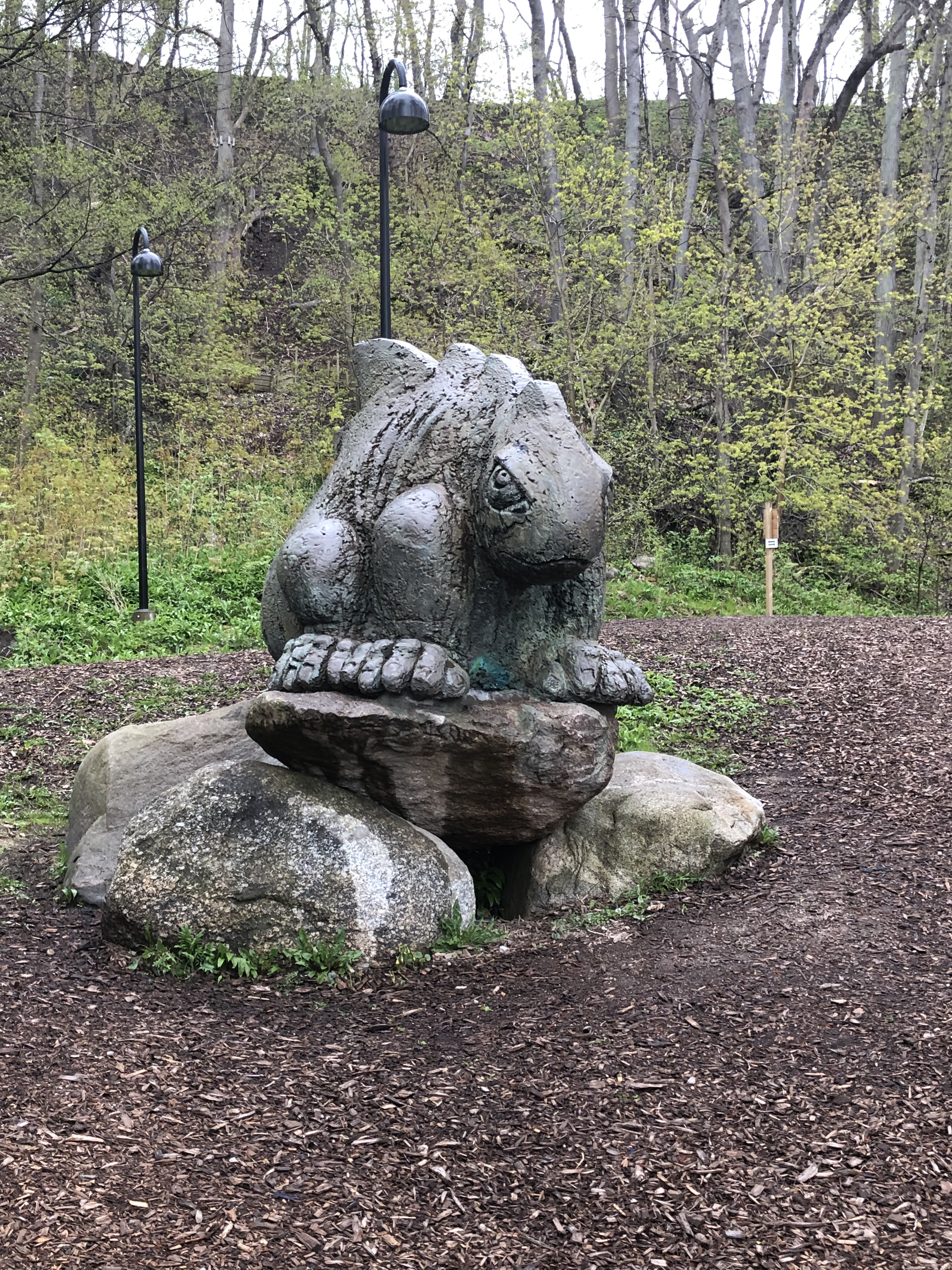
Statue of the Northern Frog created by Tauno Kangro in Viimsi Parish.

Author and historian Anatol Lieven mentioned the Northern Frog in the opening to his 1993 book The Baltic Revolution: Estonia, Latvia, Lithuania and the Path to Independence. He described the book as being like the Northern Frog, an "awkward sort of beast" with a "bad temper".

In the 2007 novel, The Man Who Spoke Snakish, author Andrus Kivirähk depicts the Northern Frog as a giant, dormant protector of the Estonians against Christian crusaders. In the book, the creature can only be awakened by ten thousand people speaking "snakish," a language that has nearly gone extinct by the novel's start.

In 2025, the artist Navitrolla installed a statue in Võru at Tamula Beach called the Tamula konn that explicitly draws on the legend of the Northern Frog. Navitrolla positions the frog as a protector. It has spikes on its back to defend itself. It also has a soap bubble in its mouth which stands for the "fragility and transience" of the Võro language.

== See also ==
- Azhi Dahaka
- Dragonslayer
- Mythological hybrid
- The Bird of Truth
- The Langs' Fairy Books
- The Princess and the Dragon
- Tugarin Zmeyevich
