= Toell the Great =

Mythological character

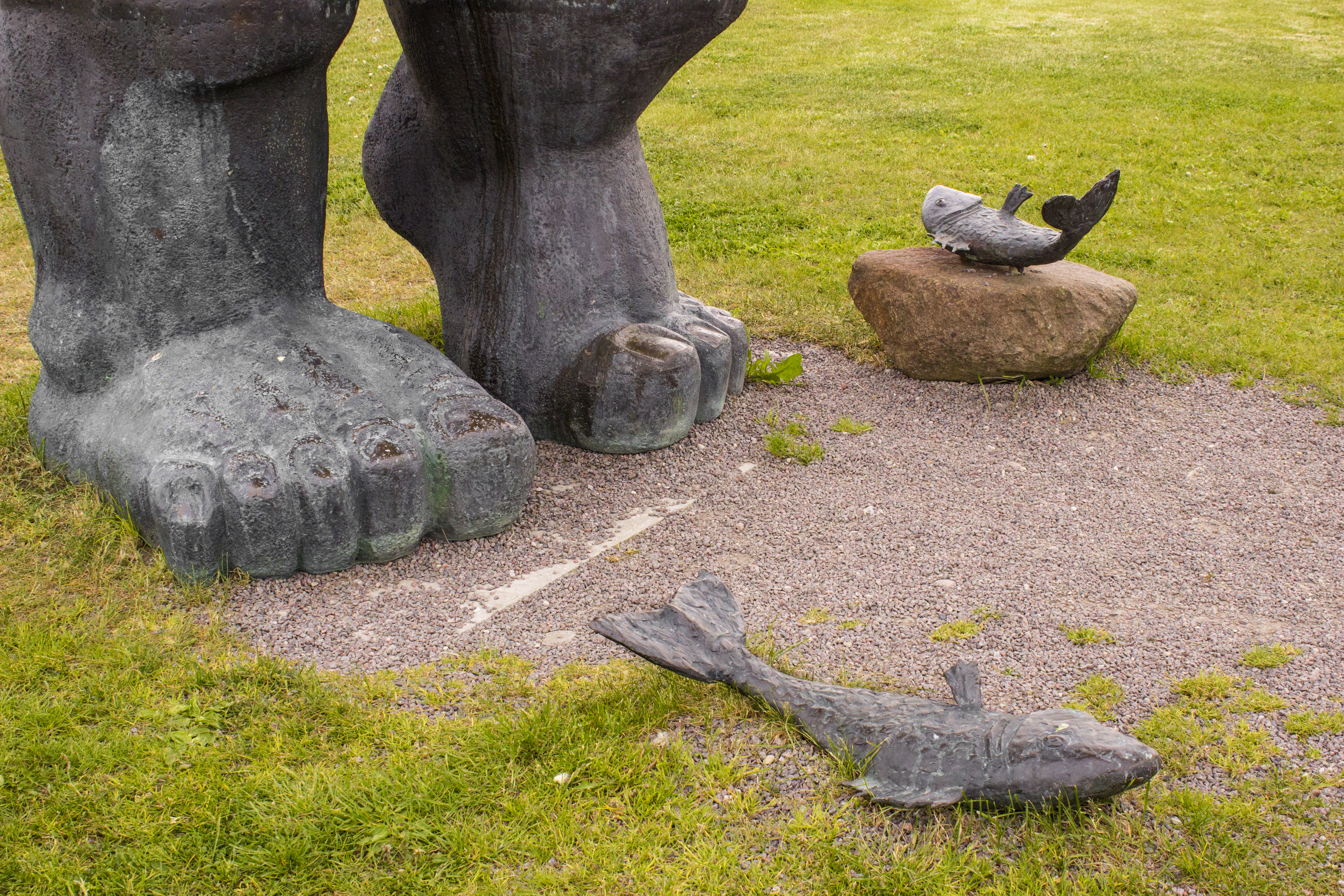
- A sculpture of Suur Tõll in Kuressaare (by Tauno Kangro, 2002)

Creature information
- Similar entities: Kalevipoeg
- Folklore: Estonian mythology

Origin
- Region: Saaremaa

Suur Tõll (lit. 'Toell the Great') is a mythological giant hero who lived on the Estonian island of Saaremaa.

== Legend ==
Suur Tõll lived with his wife Piret in the coastal village of Tõlluste (Tölluste) by the Baltic Sea. He tossed huge rocks everywhere, mostly aiming for his archenemy Vanatühi (The Devil) or other enemies of the local Saaremaa islanders. Although Tõll was the king of Saaremaa, he lived as a common farmer. He often visited his brother Leiger on the neighboring Hiiumaa (Dagö) island. He was so tall that he could almost walk there (the Soela Strait has passageways only 2-3m deep, and is about 6km across). His walking stick was a 5 fathom spruce tree trunk.

Tõll was always kind and ready to help, but very hot-tempered. He loved to eat cabbage, drink beer, and go to the sauna (his wife was always busy gathering rocks for his sauna stove).

=== Death ===
When an enemy decapitated him, Suur Tõll put his head on his sword and walked to his grave, which is supposed to be somewhere in Tõlluste. When Suur Tõll died, he promised to rise from the grave and help people in case of war. However, naughty children made fun of him by yelling "Tõll, Tõll, wake up, there is a war in the yard". Suur Tõll rose, grew angry and went back to his grave, swearing never to come back.

== Theories ==
It is supposed that stories about Suur Tõll are based on a historical person, possibly an ancient ruler of Saaremaa, who was also very tall. Suur Tõll is sometimes also connected with the local German (or Germanised) noble family Toll. Some members of that family are said to have been very tall (more than 2.10 meters). Tõll and Toll are also surnames still in use in Saaremaa.

== Modern day ==
In the village of Ninase, there are two old windmills reshaped into the figures of Tõll and Piret. Newlyweds of Saaremaa go there to pay tribute to the mythical heroes of their island.

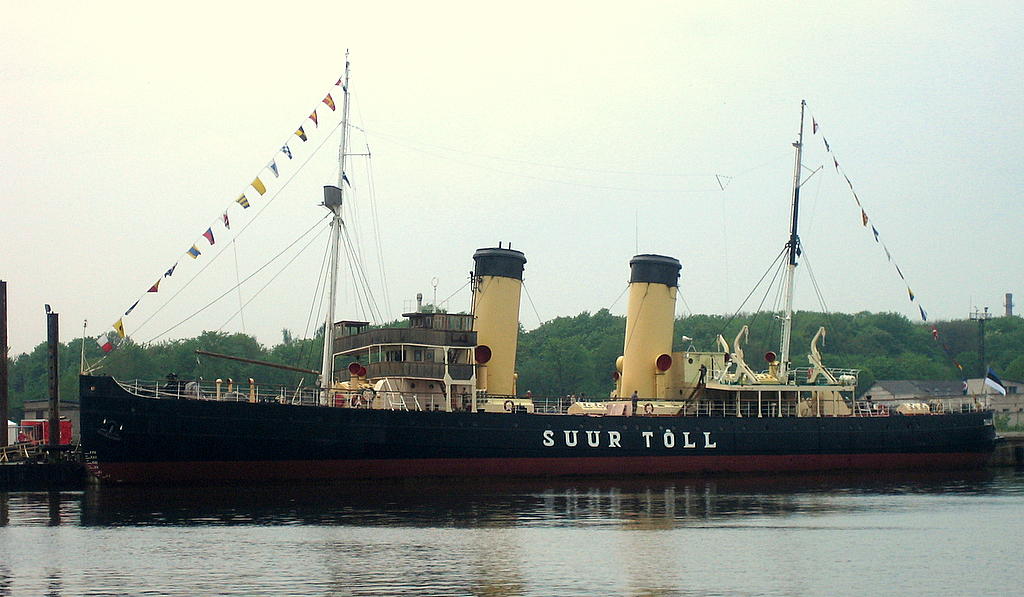
Estonian icebreaker Suur Tõll

- Toell the Great has inspired the cartoon movie Suur Tõll (Tallinnfilm 1980).
- Icebreaker Suur Tõll is a museum ship in Tallinn.
- A sculpture of Suur Tõll and Piret was created in 2002 by Estonian sculptor Tauno Kangro, and is now situated by the SPA Hotel Meri in Kuressaare, Saaremaa.
- The two ferries connecting mainland Estonia (at Virtsu) to Saaremaa (at Kuivastu on Muhu) are named Tõll and Piret.
