= Martti Soosaar =

Estonian journalist and writer

Martti Soosaar (11 June 1933 – 18 April 2017) was an Estonian journalist and writer.

The son of photographer Hans Soosaar, Soosaar graduated from the University of Tartu in journalism. He worked as a newspaper editor for Noorte Hääl. He featured in the Estonian Radio television sitcom "Õhtujutud" ('Evening Stories') which consisted of interviews with the artists. Martti Soosaar has also written for Kymen Sanomat, a major Finnish broadsheet newspaper.

Soosaar has also been involved with film and theatre and in 1997 released Lea Valter and then in 1998/1999 he filmed and starred in the documentary Enn Põldroosi härrasmeeste seltskond in which he worked with noted animation film director Rein Raamat.

== Selected works ==
- Raamatud "August Vomm" (1977)
- "Kunstnik ja modell" (1978)
- "Ateljee-etüüde" (interviews with artists 1983)
- "Ateljee-etüüde. 2 (interviews with artists; 1990)
- "Eesti ex libris" (Helsinki)
- "Tuntud ja tundmatu Gori" (2003)
- "Lase vareseid!"
- Stsenaariumid "Lea Valter" (1997) (film)
- "Enn Põldroosi härrasmeeste seltskond" (1998) (film)
