= Kivilõppe =

Village in Estonia

- Village
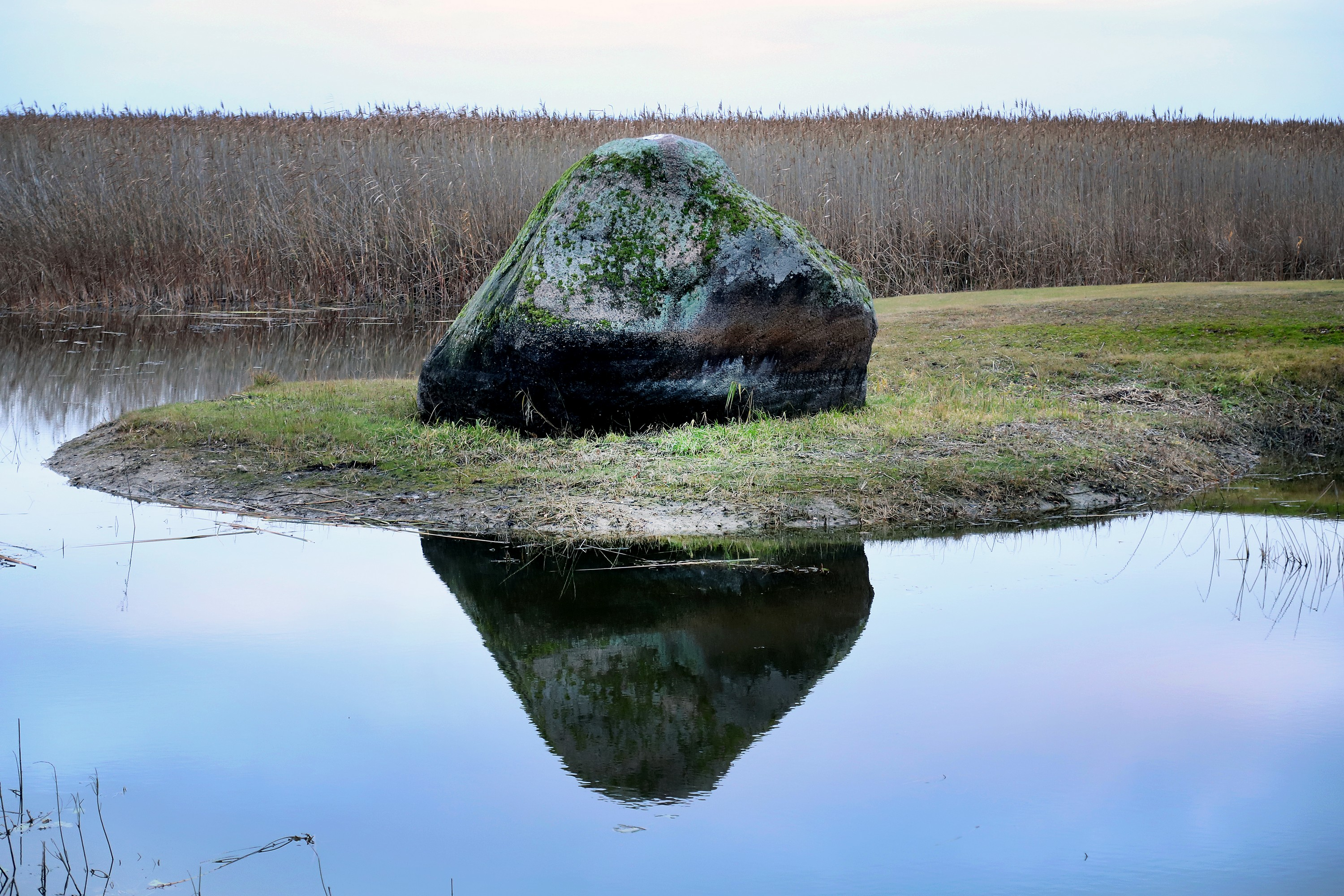
- Kalevipoeg's stone in Kivilõppe

- Location in Estonia
- Coordinates: 58°13′34″N 25°58′33″E
- Country: Estonia
- County: Viljandi County
- Municipality: Viljandi Parish

Population (2011 Census)
  - Total: 35

Kivilõppe is a village in Viljandi Parish, Viljandi County, in southern Estonia. Until the 2017 administrative reform of Estonian municipalities, the village was located in Tarvastu Parish. It is located on the western shore of Lake Võrtsjärv, about 7 km (4 mi) east of Mustla, the administrative centre of the municipality. As of the 2011 census, Kivilõppe's population was 35.

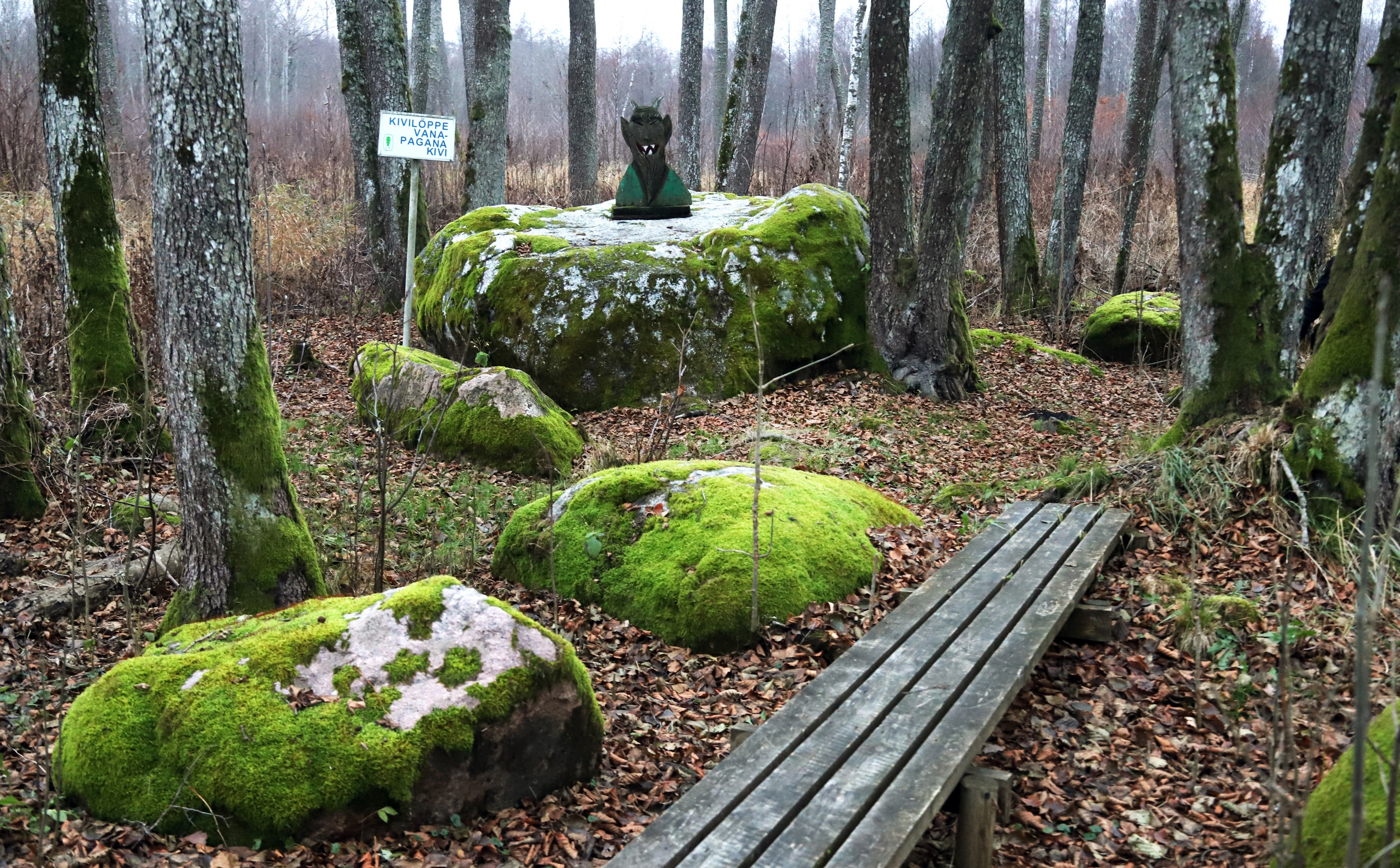
Vanapagan's stone in Kivilõppe

== Notable people ==
Notable people that were born in Kivilõppe include the following:

- Ants Simm (1877–1946), actor, director, diplomat, and journalist
- Juhan Simm (1885–1959), composer
