= Estonian gunboat Pikker =

Former Estonian gunboat

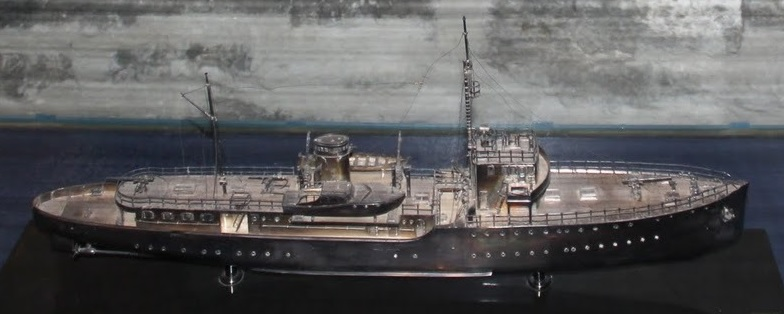
- Model of the ship Pikker at the Estonian Maritime Museum

History

Estonia
- Name: Pikker
- Builder: Tallinna Sadamatehased
- Launched: 1939
- Commissioned: 1940
- Decommissioned: October 29, 1940

Soviet Union
- Name: Pikker, Пиккер and others
- Commissioned: October 29, 1940
- Decommissioned: 1961

Soviet Union
- Name: Moskowskij Uniwiersitiet (Московский университет)
- Commissioned: 1961
- Decommissioned: 1972
- Fate: scrapped in 1978 or 1976

General characteristics
- Class & type: gunboat, yacht
- Displacement: standard: 500 t (1,100,000 lb); full: 540 t (1,190,000 lb)
- Length: 58 m (190 ft 3 in)
- Draft: 2.4 m (7 ft 10 in)
- Propulsion: 1,900 hp (1,398 kW): 2 diesel engines manufactured by Deutsche Werke Kiel; 2 propellers
- Speed: 18 kn (33 km/h; 21 mph)
- Complement: 29 sailors (Estonian Navy); 43 sailors (Soviet Navy)
- Sensors & processing systems: radar (from 1948)
- Armament: 2 x 75 mm L/50 guns (until 1941); 3 x 45 mm guns (from 1941 to 1946); 2 x 7.62 mm machine guns; 1 x anti-aircraft Lewis gun; depth charge thrower (optional)

Pikker was an Estonian gunboat of original design from World War II, built in Tallinn with funds from a public collection. It served in the Estonian Navy and in the Soviet Navy, where it participated in the evacuation of Tallinn during World War II. The ship operated in the Baltic Sea from 1940 to 1946, after which it was assigned to the Black Sea Fleet, where it served as an exclusive yacht for Soviet leaders. In 1961, it was transferred as a research vessel to Moscow State University.

== Origins ==
=== Submarine Fund ===
In the 1930s, the Estonian government sought funds to build two submarines. About half of the required sum was obtained from the sale of two old destroyers, Lennuk and Wambola, to Peru. To secure the remaining funds, the Submarine Fund was established on 31 May 1933. By the end of 1934, it had collected 53,000 kroons – the most raised by any national collection effort up to that point. However, this amount was about 60 times less than the needed contribution for the construction. It was then decided that the submarines would be financed from the state budget. In March 1935, the military leader, General Johan Laidoner, decided to continue the fundraising for a much cheaper submarine chaser. As raising the new, lower amount of 300,000 kroons also proved difficult, some military personnel suggested ordering an unarmed vessel. Instead, it was decided to proceed with another round of the campaign, which ultimately concluded on 5 July 1937.

=== Construction and assignment in the Estonian Navy ===
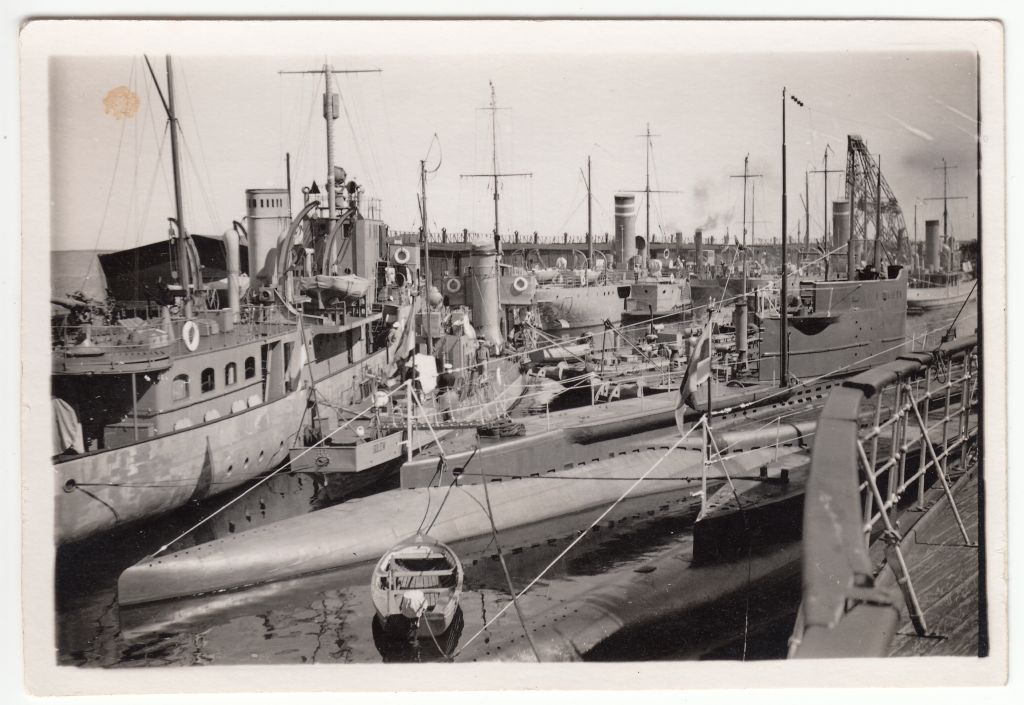
Pikker and other ships of the Estonian Navy in Tallinn Harbor (1940)

The ship was ordered from the Tallinna Sadamatehased shipyard in the same year (Note: Bartelski & Morozow (2014) state that the ship was ordered in January 1939, which would have given the Tallinn shipyard very little time to build it.) and launched in the summer of 1939. Originally, it was intended to serve in the Estonian Border Guard as a patrol vessel and also to be used as a presidential yacht for the head of state during foreign visits. Due to the threat of war, it was taken over by the navy, either during construction or after being launched and equipped. The ship was commissioned in the spring of 1940 under the name Pikker, (Note: Bartelski & Morozow (2014) give the name Pikkeri.) named after the god from Estonian mythology who controls weather phenomena, especially thunderstorms. Pikker was assigned to the Allveelaevastiku divisjoni on 11 May 1940, along with both Kalev-class submarines, for which it was to serve as a depot ship. The first commander of the vessel was Commander Alfred Pupp.

== Service in the Soviet Union ==
=== Before the war ===
After Estonia was occupied by the Red Army in June 1940, Pikker was taken over by the Soviet Baltic Fleet and classified as an aviso. The exact date of the ship's seizure is unclear. Hartmut Ehlers states that the official inclusion took place on October 20, after the actual occupation, while Jarosław Malinowski and Oskar Myszor indicate October 29 as the date of actual takeover, considering the order 00208 from August 18/19 as the official one. Like other former Estonian ships, the vessel temporarily retained its name, written in Cyrillic (Пиккер). In the Soviet Navy, the crew size was increased from 29 to 43 members.

=== World War II ===
After the German aggression against the Soviet Union began on 22 June 1941, Pikker became the flagship of the Fleet's Military Council – the presidential cabins were occupied by Fleet Commander Vladimir Tributs. When the Germans started their attack on Tallinn, the decision was made to evacuate the city. Besides the already accommodated members of the Military Council, Pikker took on board several important communist notables of the Estonian SSR. It departed from Tallinn on the night of August 27/28 as part of the 2nd squadron escorting the evacuation of troops. On the way, it assisted the survivors of the flotilla leader Minsk (type Leningrad), which had hit a mine, rescuing a total of 78 people. Pikker and the accompanying submarines were attacked by enemy aircraft, but none of the dropped bombs hit the target. It reached the Kronstadt base on August 29. After a few weeks, Pikker was relocated to Leningrad, where it was rearmed – instead of two 75 mm guns, three 45 mm guns were installed. The ship remained in the base until the end of the war, changing its name to Kijew (Киев) on 2 December 1941, to Luga (Луга) on 15 March 1943, and possibly to Ilmen (Ильмень) in 1944.

=== Black Sea ===
After the war, the ship underwent reconstruction in Tallinn, then sailed to Sevastopol, where work continued at the Sevmorzavod shipyard. The vessel was adapted to its original, representative function. The guns were removed, and only light armament was installed. The ship was equipped with radar and sun awnings, new furniture was added, and more motorboats and lifeboats were included. The ship received a new name, Rion (Рион), on June 21 or July 21, 1948.

Rion was assigned as an escort for the yacht Angara. It hosted the highest leaders of the Soviet Union and allied states, such as Joseph Stalin, Leonid Brezhnev, Josip Broz Tito, and Nikita Khrushchev, who sailed on it from Izmail to Sevastopol.

In 1961, the ship was decommissioned from the Soviet Navy and handed over to Moscow State University. The Sevastopol shipyard converted it into a research vessel, including the installation of a boom-type trawl. Under the new name Moskovskiy universitet (Московский университет), it was used for Black Sea research from bases in Sevastopol and Yalta. It was decommissioned in 1972.

=== Fate of the ship ===
There are various theories about the ship's fate. According to one of the former Estonian crew members, it was scrapped in 1976. Other sources state that it was scrapped in 1978, but there is disagreement about whether this occurred in Inkerman. The version that the ship was beached on the Caucasian coast and served as a restaurant is largely dismissed. After regaining independence, Estonia made several attempts to locate its presidential yacht, but these efforts were unsuccessful.

The Estonian Maritime Museum currently holds a pre-war metal model of Pikker.

== Construction ==
Pikker was a ship measuring 58 m in length (57 m at the design waterline) and 7.34 m in width. Its standard draft was 2.4 m. The full displacement was 540 tons, while the design or standard displacement was 500 tons. Around the 20th meter from the bow, there was a deck break. The superstructure fitted into this break was intended for the president and other official guests. Its standard was higher compared to the other compartments, featuring large windows instead of portholes. The forward superstructure had two levels. Both superstructures had masts, and between them, on the aft superstructure, there was a funnel.

Pikker was powered by two diesel engines manufactured by Deutsche Werke Kiel. Their combined power of 1,900 hp allowed the vessel to reach a maximum speed of 18 knots.

The main armament of the ship in the Estonian Navy consisted of two 75 mm caliber guns, each with a barrel length of 50 calibers (L/50) – one located at the bow and the other mounted on the edge of the aft superstructure. The armament was supplemented by two 7.62 mm machine guns and an anti-aircraft Lewis gun. During the war, the main guns were replaced with three 45 mm caliber guns. An optional piece of equipment was a depth charge launcher.

On the aft superstructure, on both sides of the funnel, there were a motorboat (on the starboard side) and a wooden lifeboat (on the port side).

== List of ship names ==
Latin alphabet	Cyrillic script	Date of name assignment	Reference
Pikker	Пиккер	1940	Pikker (mythology)
Kijew	Киев	2 December 1941	Kyiv
Luga	Луга	15 March 1943	Luga or Luga river
Ilmien (Note: Malinowski & Myszor (2010, p. 66) list this name as hypothetical.)	Ильмень	1944	Lake Ilmen
Rion	Рион	21 June 1948	Rioni
Moskowskij Uniwiersitiet	Московский университет	1961	Moscow State University

== Bibliography ==
- Malinowski, Jarosław; Myszor, Oskar (2010). ""Zaginiony" flagowiec estońskiej floty". Okręty Wojenne (in Polish). 2 (100). Tarnowskie Góry. ISSN 1231-014X. Archived from the original on 2016-03-04.
- Bartelski, Andrzej; Morozow, Mirosław (2014). "Okręty podwodne Estonii". Morze, statki i okręty (in Polish). 3/4 (143). Warsaw: Magnum X. ISSN 1426-529X.
- Tributs, Vladimir (1985). Балтийцы сражаются (in Polish). Moscow: Wojenizdat.
