= Vanapagan =

Mythological character

Kalevipoeg and Vanapagan by Kristjan Raud (undated)

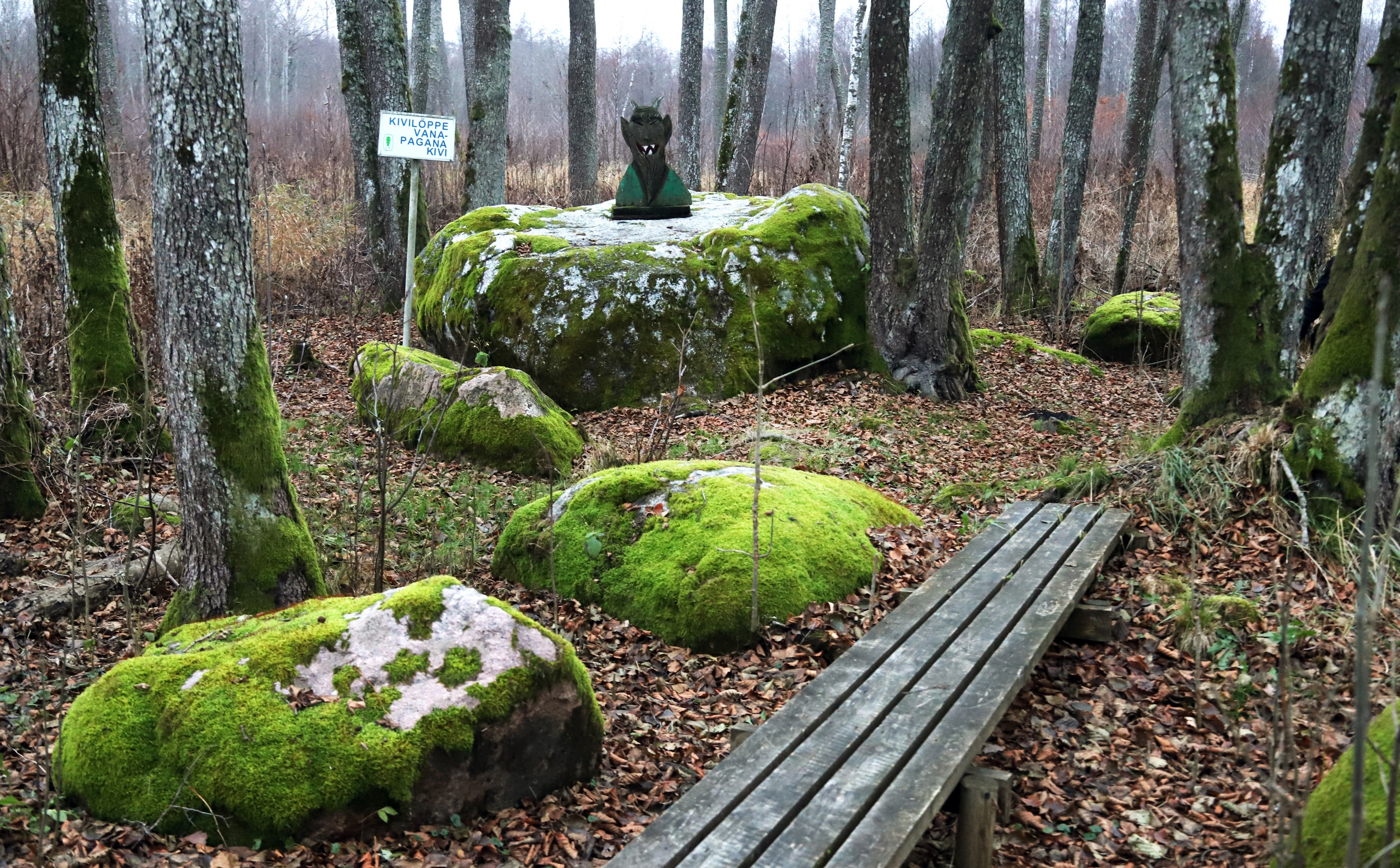
Vanapagan's stone in the village of Kivilõppe

In Estonian mythology, Vanatühi ("Old empty one", or alternatively, Vanapagan, "Old devil") is a/the devil or god of the underworld, a giant farmer who is more stupid than malevolent.

Vanapagan is the ogre character in Estonian versions of the series of internationally known folktales of the stupid ogre, tale types 1000–1199 in the Aarne–Thompson classification system. In these stories, he is outwitted by his servant Kaval Ants (Crafty Hans).

Among these folktales is the tale of Vanapagan stealing the musical instrument belonging to the god of lightning Pikne, representing the international tale type "The Ogre Steals the Thunder's Instruments (Pipe, Sack, etc.)" (No. 1148B in the Aarne–Thompson classification system).

He is also the worst enemy of Suur Tõll, a giant known in the folklore of the island Saaremaa. Tõll is decapitated during a battle with Vanatühi's forces.

Vanatühi sometimes wears a hat of fingernails (Estonian: küüntest kübar) that makes him invisible.
