= Juhan Simm =

Estonian composer

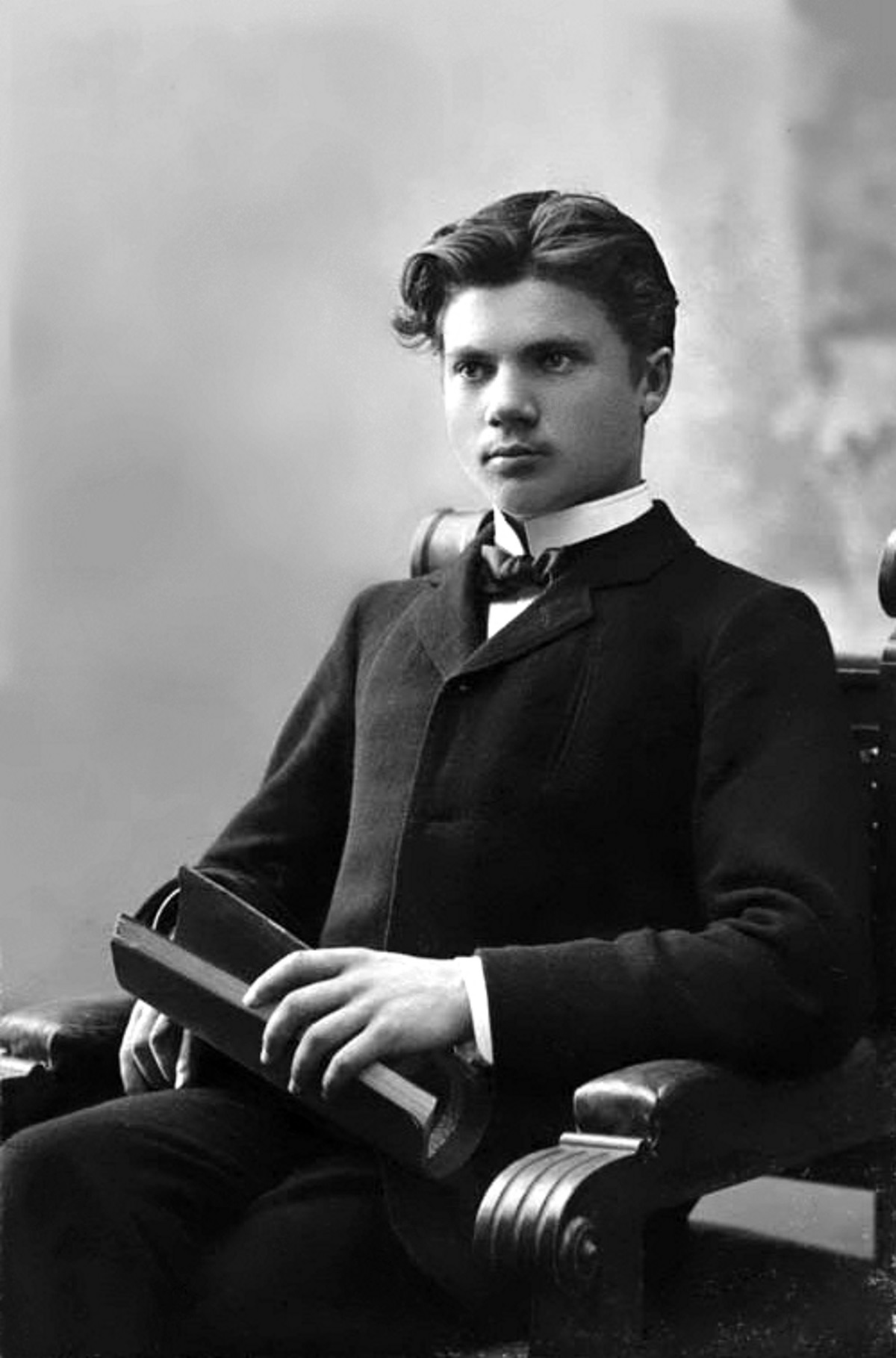
- Born: 12 August 1885; Kivilõppe, Kreis Fellin, Governorate of Livonia
- Died: 20 December 1959 (aged 74); Tartu, then part of Estonian SSR, Soviet Union
- Occupations: Composer, conductor
- Years active: 1906–1959

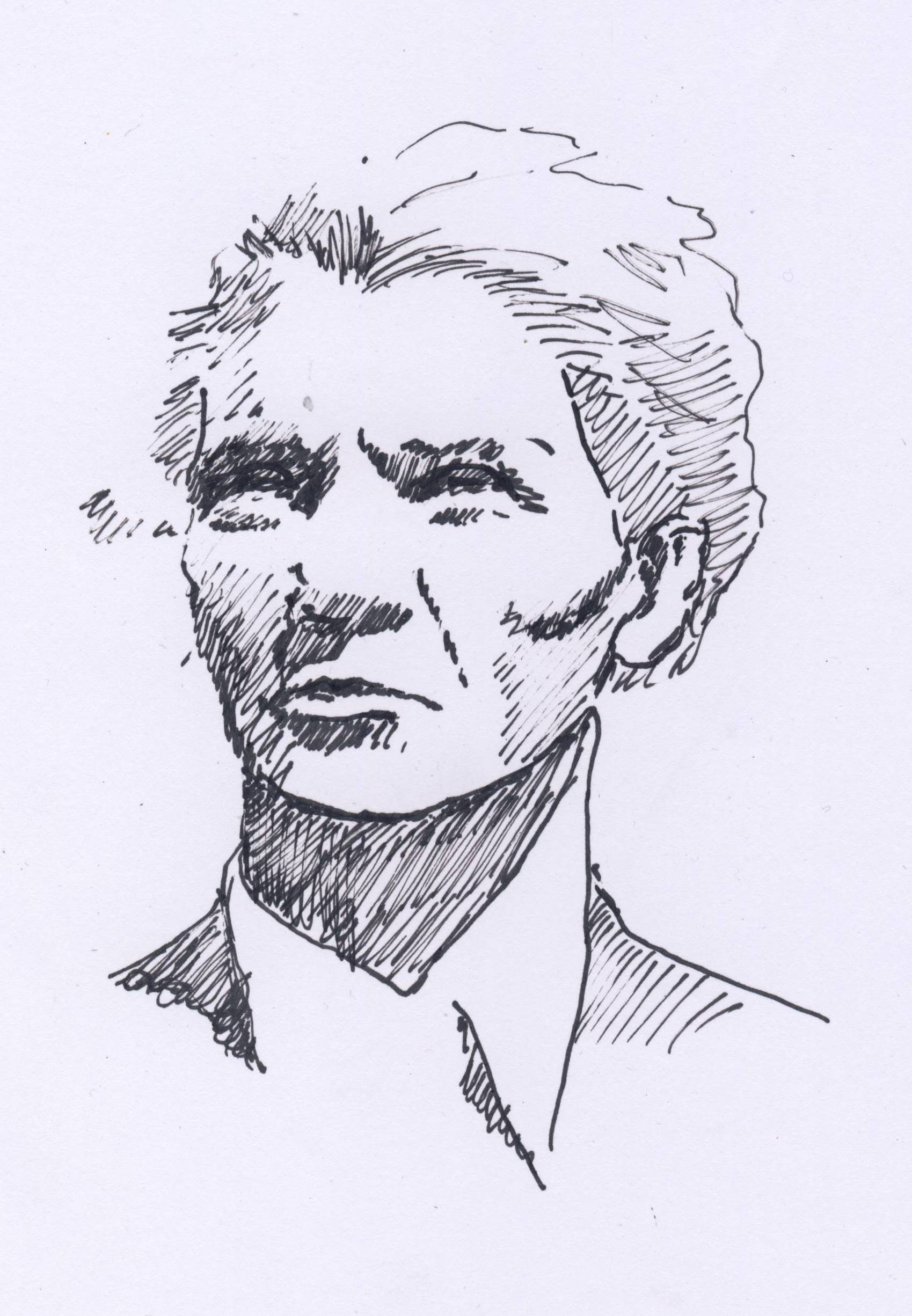
A sketch of Simm as an older man

Juhan Simm (12 August [O.S. 31 July] 1885 in Kivilõppe – 20 December 1959 in Tartu) was an Estonian composer, conductor, and choir director.

Juhan Simm was born in Kivilõppe, Vana-Suislepa Parish, Kreis Fellin, Governorate of Livonia, Russian Empire. He attended the village school in Suislepa and the parish school in Tarvastu. He studied from 1906 to 1910 at the Faculty of Physics and Mathematics at the University of Tartu. Early on he discovered his passion for music. In 1908 he founded the Tartu male choir. From 1912, he was a conductor of choirs. From 1912 to 1914 he studied conducting at the Stern Conservatory in Berlin with Alexander von Fielitz and composition with Wilhelm Klatte and Julius Stern. In 1924 he honed his conducting skills at the Grand Opéra in Paris.

From 1906 to 1910, Simm was employed at the Vanemuine theatre and concert hall in Tartu. From 1914 to 1916 he was musical director at the Vanemuine theatre, from 1916 to 1925 the head of the local men's choir, and conductor from 1916 to 1940. In 1926/27 and from 1944 to 1951, Simm taught conducting, music education, and music theory at the Tartu Music School. He founded and led several choirs in Estonia.

Simm was the head of the Estonian Song Festival in 1923, 1933, 1938, 1947, and 1950. In 1947 he received the award People's Artist of the Estonian Soviet Socialist Republic.

In addition, Simm was a music critic and composer of numerous works for orchestra and choir singing. He work is characterized by Estonian national romanticism.

== Selected works ==
- 1910: "Laul orjadele" (cantata for baritone, mixed chorus and symphony orchestra, text Gustav Suits)
- 1911: "Hommik" (for male choir and symphony orchestra, text Kalevipoeg)
- 1912: "Kalevipoeg isa haual" (for male choir and symphony orchestra, text Kalevipoeg)
- 1914: Overture for Symphony Orchestra
- 1915: "Kosjasõit" (musical comedy, text August Kitzberg)
- 1915: "Kooparüütel" (operetta, libretto by Karl August Hindrey)
- 1917: Eelkevad "(cantata for men's and mixed choir, text Karl Eduard Sööt) (2nd version 1958)
- 1932: Koidula "(Overture for Symphony Orchestra)
- 1945: Overture for Symphony Orchestra
- 1950: Suite Estonian ways for symphony orchestra
- 1952: Overture for Symphony Orchestra
- 1957: Quartet for Strings

For male choir:

- "Oma saar" (Text Gustav Suits)
- "Lauljate teretus" (Text Mihkel Veske)

For mixed choir:

- "Oh, and tule" (Text Anna Haava)
