= Metsavana =

Forest spirit in Estonian mythology

Metsavana, also known as metsataat or metsaisa, is the old man of the forest, a forest deity in Estonian mythology.

== Etymology ==
Metsavana is a compound of metsa ("forest") and vana ("old, ancient"). The names metsataat and metsaisa translate to "forest father" or "forest old man".

== Mythology ==
Metsavana is one of the many types of forest spirits found in Estonian mythology, for example Metsaema ("forest mother") and metsahaldjas ("forest fairy"). He is one of many examples of an old man forest deity. Finno-Ugric folklore has links with Slavic mythology, shown in Metsavana's similarities with the Leshy and corresponding Komi forest spirit, Vörsa. Female forest spirits are generally more common in Estonian and Latvian mythology, with male forest spirits found more often in Russian mythologies.

Estonian forest spirits are often seen as tricksters, generally benevolent but posing some danger to humans who stray from the path or act against them. In Komi folk religion, he is referred to pseudonymously to avoid catching his notice, using names such as "uncle" (djadja) and "old man".

Each forest has its own metsavana. Metsavana is described as a tall elderly man with an unkempt beard, overgrown with moss. His clothes are made of birch and he wears a large birch hat and boots. Metsavana rules over the forest, deciding how plentiful the hunters' harvest will be, and he can speak with the birds and animals. They can be the protectors of wild animals, for example bears, wolves, snakes and foxes.

Friedrich Reinhold Kreutzwald states in his book on Estonian mythology that as late as the 17th and 18th centuries straw puppets dressed alternately as Metsaema (forest mother) and Metsaisa (forest father) were used in metsiku tegemine festivals. It has been suggested, however, that Kreutzwald may have made the connection himself due to the metsa etymological link, as there is no other written evidence of these names being used to describe the puppets.
