= Metsaema =

Forest spirit in Estonian mythology

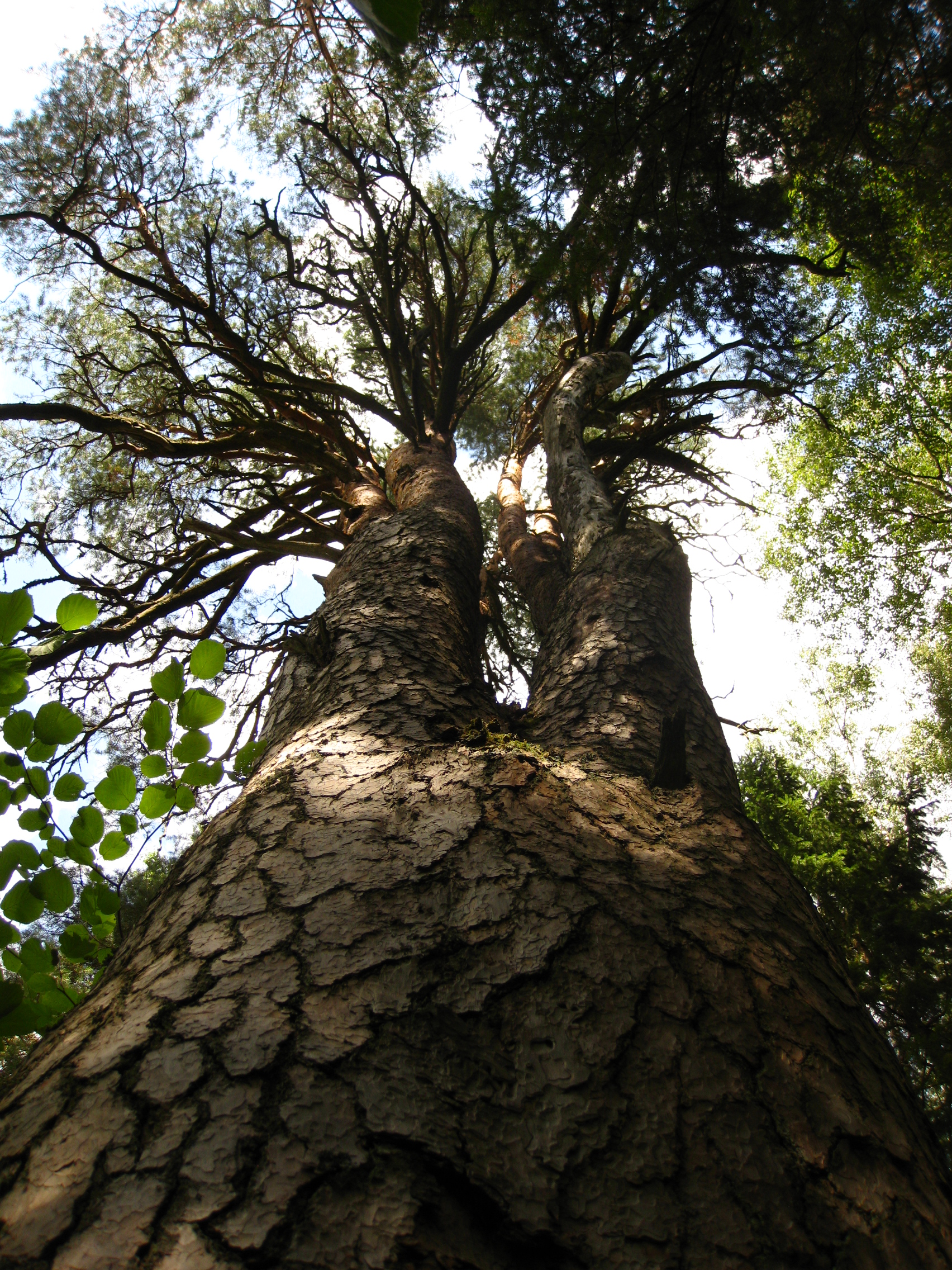
Metsaema pine, 2011

Metsaema is the mother spirit of the forest in Estonian mythology.

== Etymology ==
The name Metsaema translates to "forest mother" in Estonian (from metsa "forest" and ema "mother"). For this reason, the word metsaema can also be used as a descriptor of other similar deities in Eastern European mythology, for example Vir'ava.

== Mythology ==
The mother of the forest acts as ruler and guardian. She is sometimes also connected with fertility, acting as a midwife in some texts. Forest spirits are said to be found in each forest, ruling over the animals, birds, trees, and berries. Wild animals, such as bears, snakes and wolves, are commonly connected with them across European mythologies.

The shared elements of Finno-Ugric, Slavic, Baltic and Turkic mythology can be seen in similarities between forest mother spirits. Metsaema has strong similarities with the forest mother spirits Vir'ava, from Mordven mythology, and Meža mate, from Latvian mythology. Other related deities are the Lithuanian goddess of the forest and animals, Medeina, and the Finnish goddess of the forest, Mielikki.

Mother deities are prevalent in early Estonian and Latvian mythology (called Mātes in Latvian). Forest spirits in Estonian mythology are most often female, as can be seen with the similar metsaneitsi, metsapiiga and metsapreili, all translating to "forest maiden". This is in some contrast with Slavic mythology, where male forest spirits have the equivalent roles of protector of the forest. Estonian mythology, however, does have both male and female forest spirits, for example Metsavana, the old man of the forest and forest father. These kinds of deities are normally seen as solitary but are linked in some Russian and Kerelian texts as husband and wife.

According to Friedrich Reinhold Kreutzwald, straw puppets dressed alternately as Metsaema (forest mother) and Metsaisa (forest father) were used in metsiku tegemine festivals in the 17th and 18th centuries. This however, may be his extrapolation due to the metsa etymological link, as there is no other written evidence of these names being used to describe the puppets.

The Metsaema mänd (Forest Mother Pine) is an historic protected pine tree in Viljandi Parish, Viljandi County, Estonia.
