= Ebajalg =

Estonian mythological being

Ebajalg (whirlwind) is a being found in Estonian mythology. It is a whirlwind, believed to be a malicious spirit or demon. They are described as having great strength, often leading to destruction.

== Sources ==
- et:Tuulispask (rahvapärimus) (Estonian)
