= Piret =

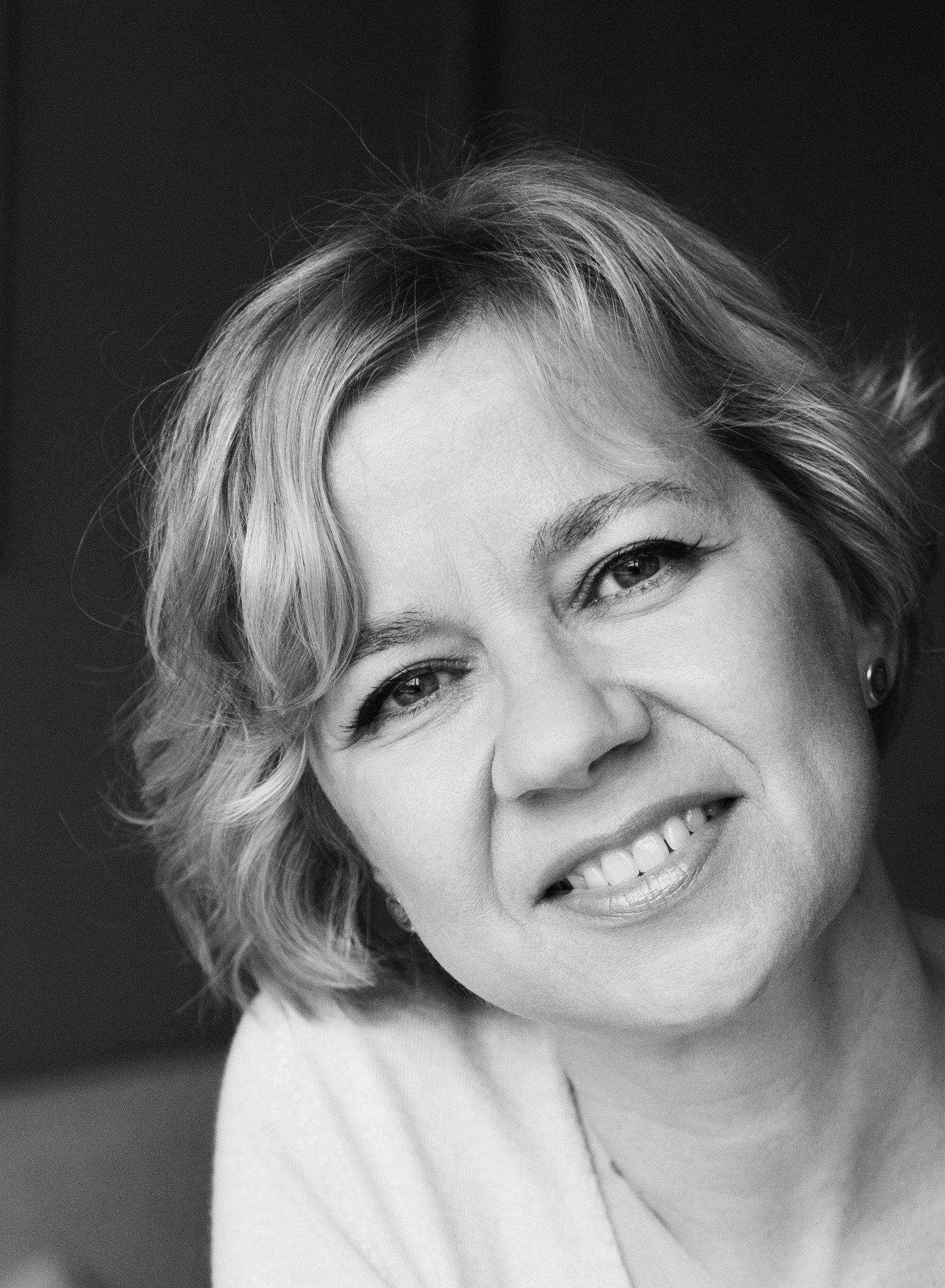
- A portrait of Estonian writer and illustrator Piret Raud.
- Gender: Female
- Language: Estonian
- Name day: 1 February

Origin
- Region of origin: Estonia

Piret is an Estonian feminine given name. It is also a type of Estonian potato. (Note: See Piret (kartulisort).)

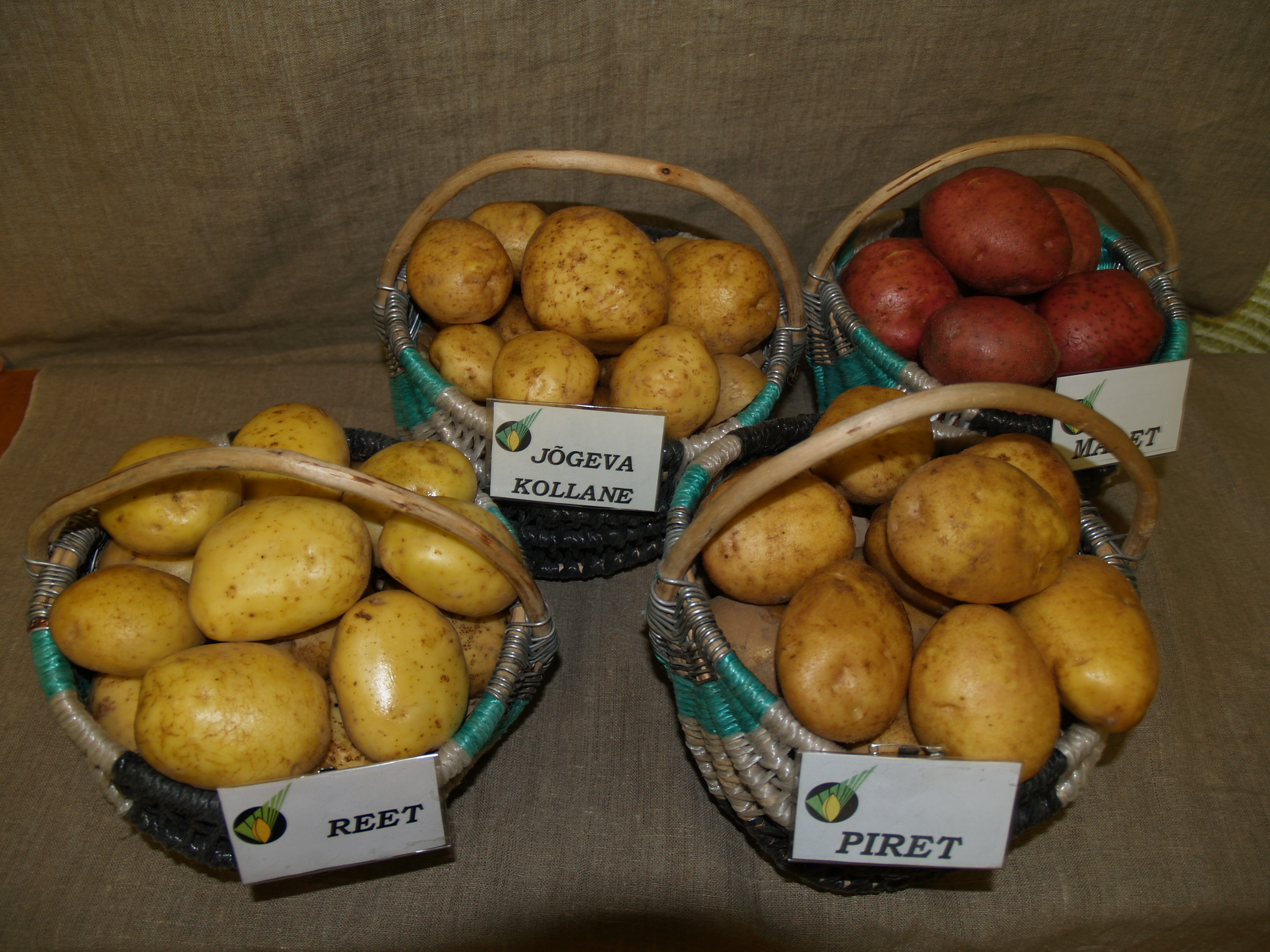
Potato varieties bred in Jõgeva including the Reet, Jõgeva yellow, Maret, and Piret

People named Piret include:

- Piret, wife of Suur Tõll in Estonian mythology
- Piret Bristol (born 1968), poet, prosaist and novelist
- Piret Hartman (born 1981), politician
- Piret Jaaks (born 1980), writer
- Piret Järvis (born 1984), singer, guitarist, and songwriter (Vanilla Ninja)
- Piret Kalda (born 1966), actress
- Piret Krumm (born 1989), actress, singer, and comedian
- Piret Laurimaa (born 1971), actress
- Piret Niglas (born 1968), cross-country skier
- Piret Pormeister (born 1985), cross-country skier
- Piret Raud (born 1971), children's writer, illustrator and translator
- Piret Saluri (born 1943), translator and diplomat
- Piret Viirma (born 1968), draughts player
