= Rein Raamat =

Estonian animated film director

Rein Raamat (born 20 March 1931) is an Estonian animation film director, artist and screenwriter. He is the first internationally successful Estonian animator and along with Elbert Tuganov is regarded as the "Father of Estonian Animation". He has directed many short animated films since the early 1970s and also produced over 20 documentary films.

== Biography ==
Raamat was born in Türi, Järva County and graduated from the Estonian Art Institute in 1957 as a painter. Between 1957 and 1971 he worked as an artist and director of feature films based in Tallinn. In 1971, he founded his own animation studio, Joonisfilm, a division of the Tallinnfilm studio, and he started making his own films. From 1989 to 1995, he was the artistic director of Studio B, which he established, employing about 120 people.

One of his notable films is Põrgu (Hell), released in 1983, which he based on the art of fellow Estonian Eduard Wiiralt from the 1930s.

Since the early 1990s he has been involved with many documentaries in Estonia. In 1998, he worked with the journalist Martti Soosaar in producing the documentary Enn Põldroosi härrasmeeste seltskond.

== Selected filmography ==
- 1972: Vari ja tee (short)
- 1972: Veekandja (short)
- 1973: Lend (short)
- 1974: Kilplased (short)
- 1974: Värvilind (short)
- 1975: Rüblik (short)
- 1976: Kütt (short)
- 1977: Antennid jääs (short)
- 1978: Kas on ikka rasvane? (short)
- 1978: Põld (short)
- 1980: Suur Tõll (short)
- 1983: Põrgu (short)
- 1985: Kerjus (short)
- 2012: Tiiu Kirsipuu. Edu kood (short)
