= Laima Adlytė =

Lithuanian draughts player (born 1971)

Personal information
- Born: March 9, 1971 (age 55) Vilnius, USSR

Sport
- Country: Lithuania
- Sport: Draughts
- Rank: Woman International Master (2004)

Achievements and titles
- Personal best: 2108 (October 2014, rating)

Laima Adlytė–Pakuckienė (born March 9, 1971, in Vilnius, USSR) is a Lithuanian international draughts player. Many times champion of Lithuania in International draughts. International Master (MIF). She train by Lithuanian draughts player Edvardas Bužinskis.

Laima Pakuckienė was third at 2001 Women's World Draughts Championship. At 2013 European Team Championship Lithuanian team was second in rapid.

In 2007 graduated (lt:Vilniaus Gedimino technikos universiteto Mechanikos fakultetas). Work by disainer at General Jonas Žemaitis Military Academy of Lithuania.

== World Championship ==
- 2001 (3 place)
- 2013 (11 place) and 4 place in blitz.
- 2015 (11 place)
