= Jutta Appelt =

German politician and writer

- Born: 17 September 1939 (age 86); Greding, Bavaria, Germany
- Occupations: Politician and writer
- Political party: Christian Democratic Union

Jutta Appelt (born 17 September 1939) is a German politician and writer from the German Christian Democratic Union. She was a member of the Landtag of North Rhine-Westphalia between 1995 and 2005.
