= NUKU Theatre =

Theatre in Tallinn, Estonia

Estonian Theatre for Young Audiences
- Eesti Noorsooteater
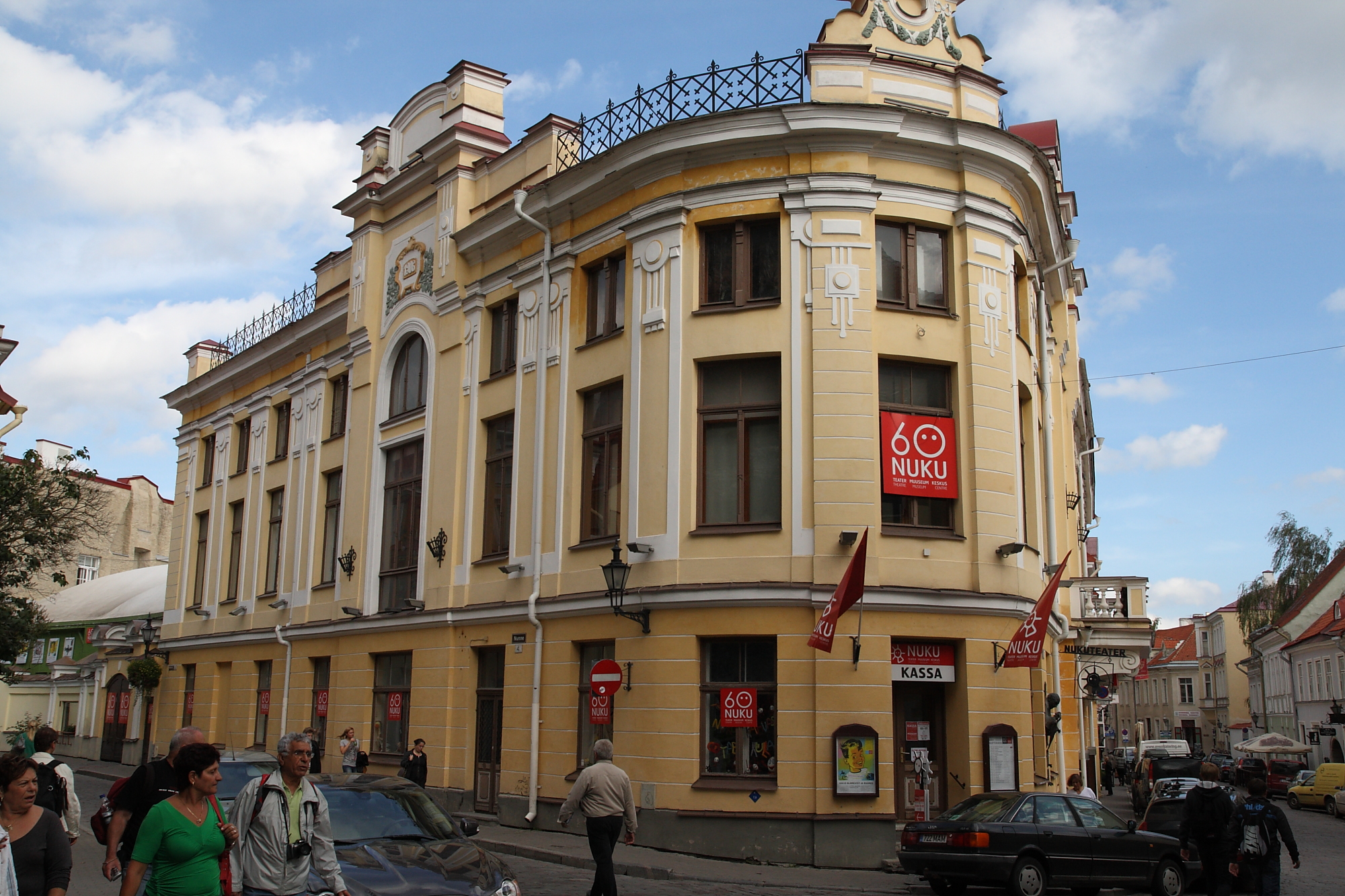
- Estonian Theatre for Young Audiences
- Interactive map of Estonian Theatre for Young Audiences
- Address: Lai 1, Nunne 4, 10133 Tallinn, Estonia
- Location: Tallinn, Estonia
- Coordinates: 59°26′18″N 24°44′35″E

Estonian Theatre for Young Audiences, formerly Estonian State Puppet Theatre, Estonian Puppet and Youth Theatre and NUKU) is an Estonian theatre located in Tallinn. The institution focuses on visual theatre and theatre for the young viewer. It is currently the only professional puppet and visual theatre in Estonia.

The theatre was founded in 1952 by Ferdinand Veike and has been directed by Leino Rei since 2024.

The theatre building is also home to a puppetry museum.
