= Tauno Kangro =

Estonian sculptor (born 1966)

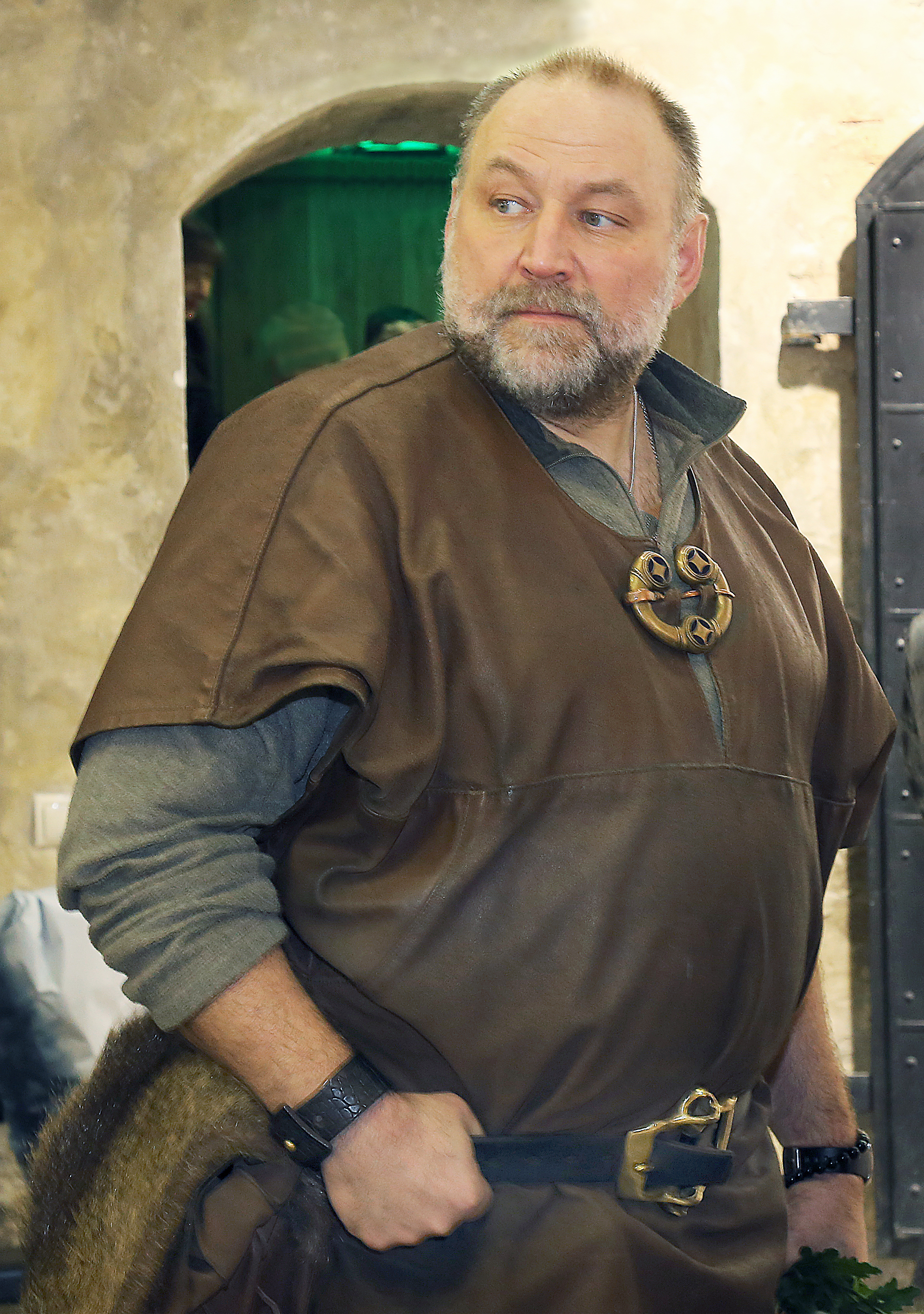
- Tauno Kangro in 2017
- Born: 25 May 1966 (age 60); Tallinn, Estonian SSR
- Citizenship: Estonian
- Education: Estonian Academy of Arts
- Known for: Sculpture
- Awards: Tallinn Order of Merit (2006)

Tauno Kangro (born 25 May 1966) is an Estonian sculptor. His works have been exhibited in more than 70 solo exhibitions worldwide. He is primarily known for his sculptures and has created several large sculptural monuments, though he also paints.

Kangro's sculptures are inspired by Scandinavian mythology, animals, people, and religion. He primarily uses stone granite, dolomite and bronze as materials. His works have become landmark objects for several locations in Estonia, and may also be found in town squares and art collections in Germany, Denmark, France, Sweden, and Finland.

He was a member of the Estonian Centre Party from 2006 to 2012.

== Early life ==
Kangro was born in Tallinn. Kangro graduated from Tallinn Secondary School No. 20 in 1984. He graduated from Estonian Academy of Arts in 1993. Alongside his formal schooling, he began art studies at Kalju Reitel's sculpture studio. From 1986 to 1993, he studied sculpture at the Estonian Academy of Arts (then the Tallinn Art University).

== Career ==
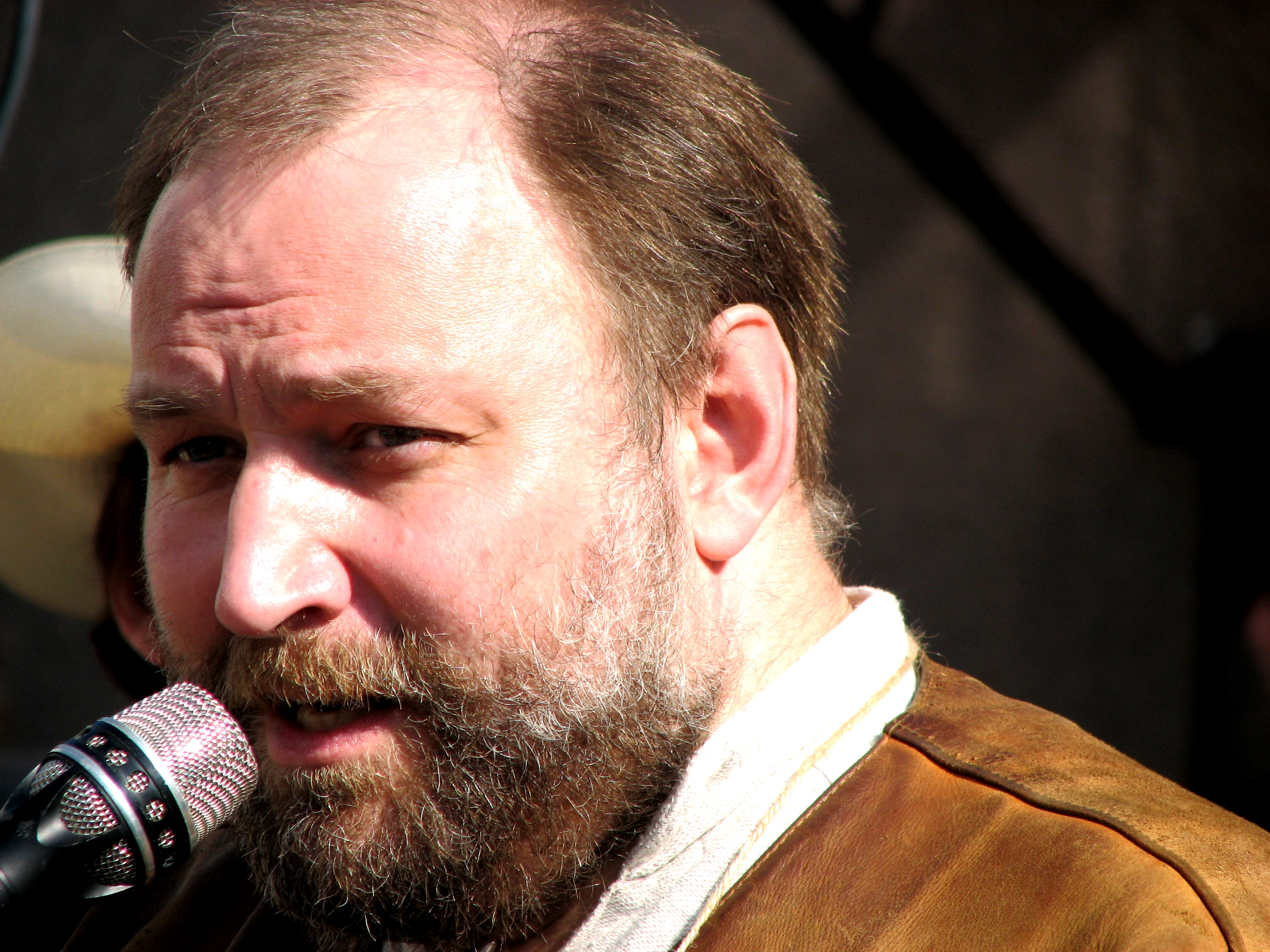
Kangro in 2010

Between 1992 and 1999, Kangro worked as an art teacher at the Old Town Educational College and Tallinn 32nd Secondary School. In addition to his work as an artist, he provides lessons at his studio-gallery.

Kangro is a member of the Estonian Artists' Association and the Estonian Sculptors' Union.

== Works ==
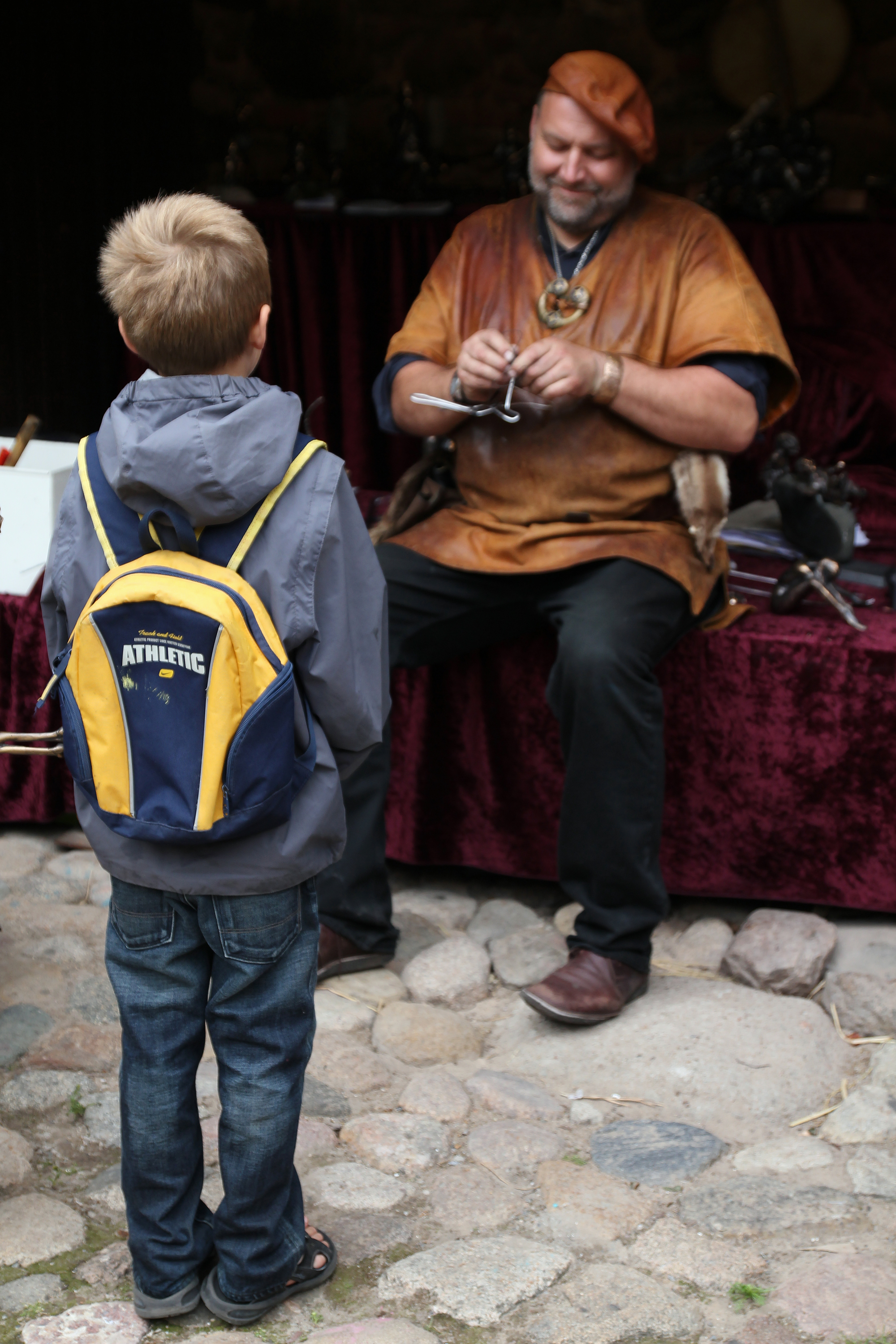
Kangro at the Tartu Hanseatic Days in 2013

As a painter, he has primarily created nudes and portraits using pastel techniques. As a sculptor, his subjects have included Lennart Meri and Ferdinand Veike. He has also illustrated books such as Maardu muistendid (Legends of Maardu, 2015) and Laitse legendid (Legends of Laitse, 2018).

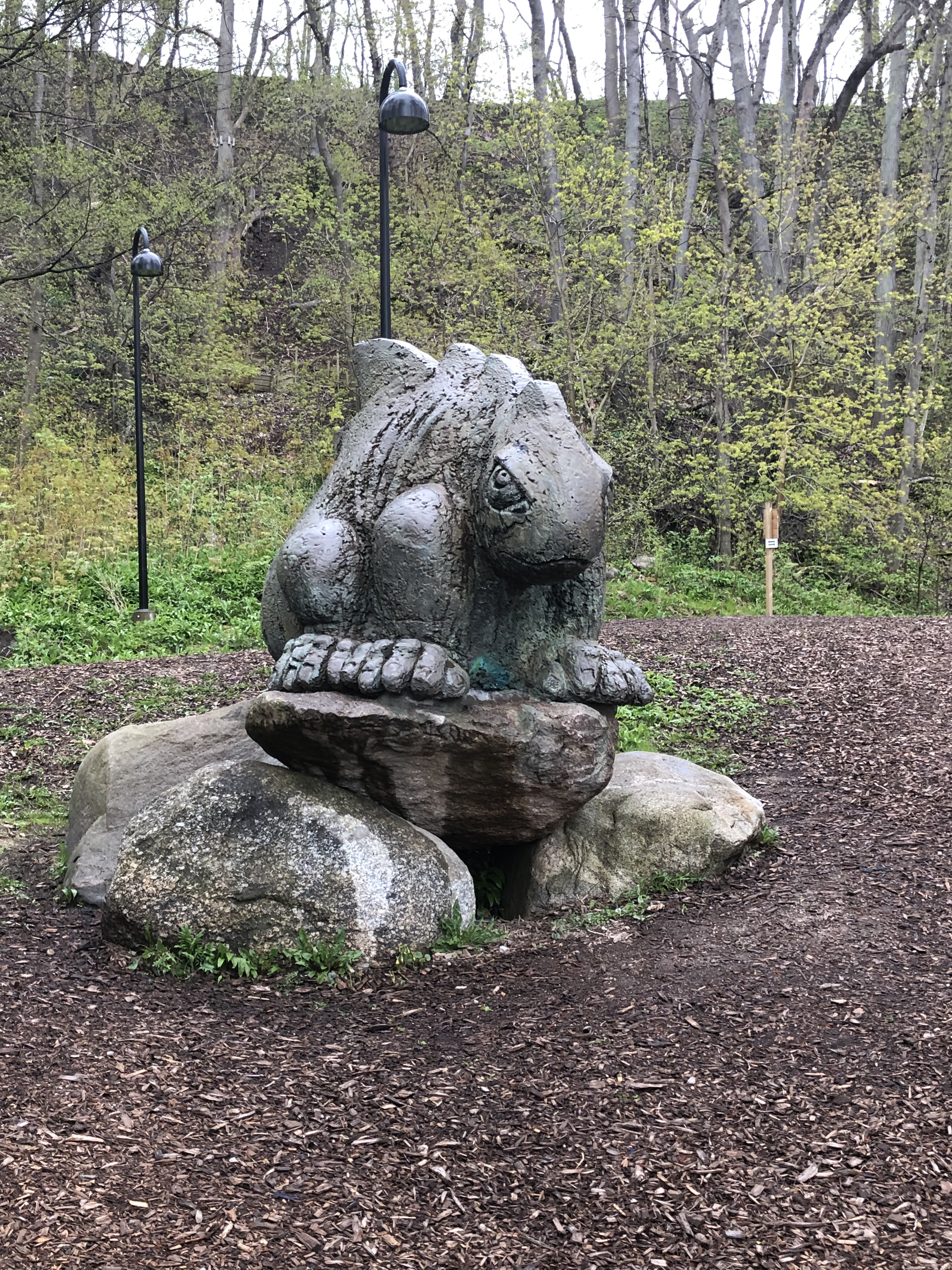
Statue of Põhja Konn the Northern Frog (also called the Dragon of the North) created by Kangro in Viimsi Parish.

His other monuments in Estonia include:

- The Bull (1989), Luige
- The Rested Man (1995), Schnelli Park, Tallinn
- Spirit of a Good Town (2001), Jõgeva
- Thinker (2002), Männi Park, Tallinn
- Happy Chimney Sweep (2010), Tallinn In 1998, Kangro proposed the installation of a 21-metre-high bronze statue of Kalevipoeg in Tallinn Bay.
- In 2006, he received the Tallinn Order of Merit for creating sculptures that enhance Tallinn's urban spaces.

As of 2024, Kangro has completed 37 sculptural monuments located in Estonia, Germany, Finland, and Denmark. His most well-known works include:

- The Lucky Chimney Sweep in Tallinn Old Town
- Tarvas in Rakvere
- Suur Tõll ja Piret said hea kalasaagi(Suur Tõll and Piret Got a Good Catch of Fish) in Kuressaare, Saaremaa.

Tarvas is his heaviest sculpture, weighing over seven tonnes. The project has been the subject of significant public debate and several documentary films by Valentin Kuik, including Kuju (The Statue, 2000) and Kalevite kanged pojad (The Mighty Sons of Kalev, 2010).

== Personal life ==
Kangro lives in Laitse, where he converted an old horse stable into a guesthouse surrounded by a sculpture garden. He maintains a studio and sculpture gallery in the Tallinn Old Town at 20 Uus Street, where both bronze sculptures and a selection of his paintings are exhibited.

Kangro has seven children, three of whom are from his marriage to Tiina Kangro.
