= Ferdinand Veike =

Estonian actor

Ferdinand Veike (13 November 1924, Saueaugu – 14 August 2015) was an Estonian puppeteer actor.

In 1952 he founded Estonian State Puppet Theater (now, the NUKU Theatre) and was a principal actor with the theatre.

In 2001 he was awarded with Order of the White Star, V class.
