= Mongolian draughts =

Board game variant

Mongolian draughts (daam, from French dame) is the local variant of draughts played in Mongolia. International draughts is also popular in Mongolia, with Mongolia sending high-scoring teams to Asian Draughts Championships (gold, silver and bronze in Kuala Lumpur, 2012), and a team to the World Mind Sports Games.

== See also ==
- List of abstract strategy games for Shatar and Hiashatar (Mongolian chess variants)
