= Jutta Vialon =

German photographer (1917–2004)

Jutta Vialon (3 March 1917 – 23 February 2004) was a German photographer based, during her working life, in Bremen. The profession was a respected one, but also very male dominated, which made her unusual. Her most important professional association was with Radio Bremen, but she also undertook work with a wide range of other Bremen enterprises and organisations.

== Life ==
Born on 3 March 1917, in Friedenau, Jutta Vialon was the only child of her father, Justus Vialon (1888–1962) and his wife, born Wally Günther. Shortly after Jutta was born war ended and her father was appointed to a position as a bank manager/director. He was based at branches in successively larger towns until 1934 when he was sent to work in the city of Bremen, which is where, albeit not without breaks, his daughter would live for the rest of her life. In 1938, Justus Vialon was appointed a board member with the Bremer Landesbank, newly formed following a bank merger.

Also in 1938, Jutta Vialon embarked on a photography apprenticeship with the Photo Dose chain. Training included brief periods living in Weimar and in Leisnig. Later, for nearly three years between January 1942 and September 1944, she worked in Berlin with the fashion photographer, Fotoatelier Sandau. In the closing part of the Second World War she was conscripted for munitions production, which meant working as a laboratory assistant at the Electrical Engineering establishment at Rielasingen.

Shortly after her father's death, Jutta Vialon registered the home where she had lived with her parents since before the war as a business premises, where she established a small photographic studio which she ran until 1975. Her work covered photo-portraits and advertising material. In April 1975, she closed the business: her reasons remain unknown. She nevertheless continued to work as a freelance photographer, mostly for Radio Bremen, fulfilling assignments at leastuntilthe early 1980s. However, in 1976 she had moved to a care home at Oyten, a short distance outside Bremen. Unmarried and childless, she died in an impoverished condition at the start of 2004, aged 86.

== Work ==
Jutta Vialon was one of very few women working as photographers in Bremen. The outstanding handcrafted qualities of her photo-portraits would probably have been forgotten had she not also been noticed on account of work in other genres. These included a 1958/59 series for the large Klockner Hutte Bremen steel works which had recently been built and commissioned on a site a short distance down-river of the city. During that period she also produced, between 1957 and 1959, a collection of photographs of the extensive refit and trials phase for the (originally French built) liner, Bremen, newly acquired by Norddeutscher Lloyd.

She is important as a chronicler of numerous television and radio productions by Radio Bremen, a broadcaster for which she worked as a stills photographer over nearly thirty years. She was on hand for the early productions of the company, from one of the earliest television broadcasts, which was of one of the city's regular Harbour Concerts, to the Rudi Carrell Show in the 1960s. Her images of the legendary Beat-Club broadcasts capture the emotional intensity redolent of the new spirit and openness to self-expression which were a feature of West German city living in the 1960s and 1970s.

She mostly worked with 135 and medium format film, producing monochrome pictures which she processed in her own premises.

Vialon left behind around 63,000 well ordered and documented, mostly monochrome, photographs of which approximately half involved Radio Bremen. These remained unnoticed in the roof space above her former homeuntilan inquisitive householder found them there and recognised their potential significance, a reaction that was endorsed in 2006 when the collection was accepted for conservation by the city archivist.
