= Jutta Irmscher =

East German skydiver

Medal record

Representing East Germany

Women's Parachuting

World Championships
Bronze medal – third place	1972 Tahlequah	Team Accuracy
Gold medal – first place	1974 Szolnok	Team Accuracy

Jutta Irmscher is a skydiver, who competed for the SC Dynamo Hoppegarten / Sportvereinigung (SV) Dynamo. In 1965, she was one of three members of the group that came third in the team accuracy landing (Gruppenzielspringen) category of the East German women's skydiving championships.
