= Jutta Deutschland =

German ballet dancer and choreographer

Jutta Angelika Deutschland (born 20 March 1958) is a German ballet dancer and choreographer. She became a prima ballerina during her many years with Berlin's Komische Oper.

== Biography ==
Born in East Germany's Bad Freienwalde, when she was only 10 years old Deutschland began her training at the State Ballet School in East Berlin. She continued her studies at the Ballet Academy in St Petersburg and at the Bolshoi Academy in Moscow. In 1975, she joined Berlin's Komische Oper, earning the title of prima ballerina in 1986, one of only six in Germany since 1945. In 1999, she founded her own ballet school in Berlin, Ballettcompagnie Deutschland, with about a hundred students. In 1997, she left the Comic Opera to open her own "Event Design" agency.

In 2009, Deutschland choreographed a figure-skating routine for Stefanie Frohberg and Tim Giesen when the award-winning pair began to dance together early in the year.

== Film ==
Jutta Deutschland has also appeared in television films and series including Ein verhängnisvoller Verdacht (1991) under the Polizeiruf 110 series, Little Herr Friedemann (1990), and Die erste Reihe (1987). Whilst she was an East German prima ballerina she starred in an hour-long documentary that was written by Helga Schubert and directed by Petra Wirbatz. Wir brauchen eine Blume (We Need a Flower) was a story about being a prima ballerina but it was not a biography and it was narrated by Corinna Harfouch.

== Literature ==
- Rellin, Martina, Klar bin ich eine Ostfrau, Rowohlt Verlag, Berlin, 2005.
