= Ilmarine =

Theatre in Narva, Estonia

Ilmarine (Estonian: Ilmarine) is a professional theater in Narva, Estonia. The theater's art director is Irina Mihhaljova.

The theater was established in 1989 by Juri and Irina Mihhaljova. The name "Ilmarine" derives from the same-name association which was established in 1874 in Narva.

Since 2010, the theater owns its own house. The house has 300-seated auditorium.
