= Piret Viirma =

Estonian draughts player (born 1968)

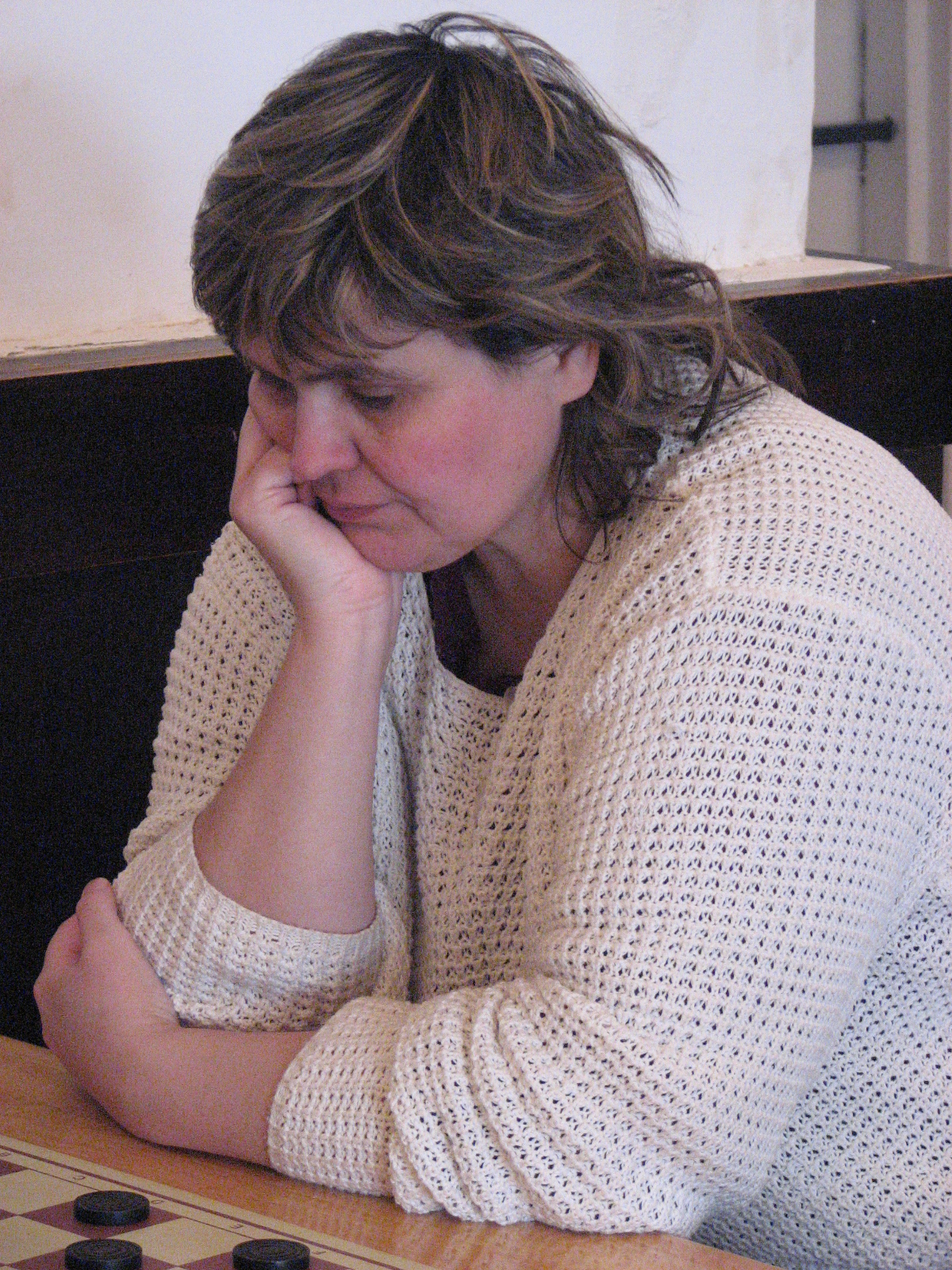
Piret Viirma

Piret Viirma (born 27 March 1968 in Paide) is an Estonian draughts player who was her nation's champion in women's draughts in 1998. She is currently the highest rated women's player in Estonia.
