= Pikne =

Estonian pagan god of lightning

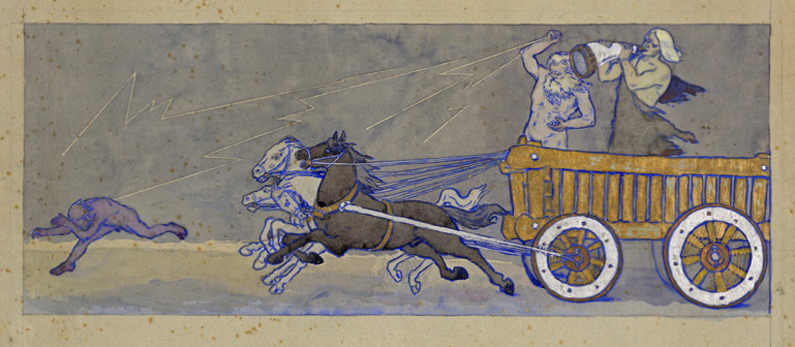
Pikker (Oskar Kallis, 1914)

Pikne (also Piken or Pikker: the long one) is the god of lightning in Estonian mythology. In Finnish, lightning is sometimes called Pitkäinen, which is similar in meaning. It is likely that both are taboo euphemisms.

There was an Estonian satire and humor magazine called Pikker.

== Legend ==
In the Middle Ages, the pagan priests made animal sacrifices to Pikne. The most famous priest of Pikne (literally: thunder priest) was the seventeenth-century Jürgen of Wihtla (Estonian: Vihtla Jürgen), who uttered the following prayer:

Take it Pikne,
the bull we are offering
with two horns
and four hooves
for ploughing and harvesting

This prayer was used by the Estonian composer Veljo Tormis in his 1974 choral work Litany to Thunder (text rendered into the Võro dialect of contemporary Southern Estonian and developed by the writer Ain Kaalep). Pikne was protector of the holy river Võhandu in Võru County, and punished people who built mills there by sending them no rain. The incident along with the prayer was recorded by the pastor Johann Gutslaff in his work Kurtzer Bericht und Unterricht Von der Falsch-heilig genandten Bäche in Lieffland Wöhhanda (published in Tartu, 1644).

According to the myths collected by Matthias Johann Eisen, Pikne is the brother of Kõu and the son of Uku. The evil underworld god Vanatühi stole his whistle or bagpipes. Without blowing it, the gods couldn't help the farmers who were praying for rain. Uku was angered and sent Pikne back to Earth, where he worked as a farmhand. He visited a wedding, where he pretended to be a musician and regained his magic instrument (compare the Eddaic myth of Trymskvida).
