= Women's World Draughts Championship =

The Women's Draughts World Championship is the world championship in international draughts organized by the World Draughts Federation (FMJD). The championship is held every two years. In the even year following the tournament must take place the World Title match.

The women's championship began in 1973 in the Netherlands and has had winners from the Soviet Union, Latvia, Ukraine, Russia and Poland. The current titleholder is Darya Tkachenko. The most successful player in the tournament's history is Zoja Golubeva, who has won the title fifteen times.

== The World Title Match ==
The championship is held every two years, in the odd years. The World Title match must take place in the even year following the world championship (tournament). Right for the World Title Match has former champion and new champion, if former champion has retained his title in the World Championship tournament he have right for the match with the player ended on the second place in the World Championship tournament.

== Classic ==
Year	Host	Gold	Silver	Bronze	format
1973	(Netherlands) Amsterdam	(Soviet Union) Elena Mikhailovskaya	(Soviet Union) Tatiana Stepanova	(France) Raymonde Barras	tournament
1974	(Netherlands) Amsterdam	(Soviet Union) Elena Mikhailovskaya	(Soviet Union) Iraida Spasskaja	(Netherlands) Barbara Graas	tournament
1975	(Netherlands) Amsterdam	(Soviet Union) Elena Mikhailovskaya	(Soviet Union) Lioubov Travina	(Netherlands) Barbara Graas	tournament
1976	(Netherlands) Amsterdam	(Soviet Union) Elena Mikhailovskaya	(Soviet Union) Lioubov Travina (Netherlands) Barbara Graas	------	tournament
1977	(Netherlands) Amsterdam	(Soviet Union) Elena Mikhailovskaya	(Soviet Union) Ludmilla Sochnenko	(Netherlands) Barbara Graas	tournament
1979	(Netherlands) Sneek	(Soviet Union) Ludmilla Sochnenko	(Soviet Union) Elena Altsjoel	(Netherlands) Petra Polman	tournament + match Ludmilla Sochnenko-Elena Altsjoel (+2=2-2)
1980	(Netherlands) De Lier	(Soviet Union) Elena Altsjoel	(Soviet Union) Ludmilla Sochnenko	(Soviet Union) Elena Mikhailovskaya	tournament
1981	(Soviet Union) Riga	(Soviet Union) Olga Levina	(Soviet Union) Irina Pashkevich	(Soviet Union) Ludmilla Sochnenko	tournament
1982	(Soviet Union) Moscow	(Soviet Union) Elena Altsjoel			match with Olga Levina (+3=8-1)
1983	(Poland) Sandomierz	(Soviet Union) Elena Altsjoel	(Soviet Union) Olga Levina	(Soviet Union) Ziwille Sakalauskaite	tournament
1984	(Soviet Union) Tallinn	(Soviet Union) Elena Altsjoel			match with Olga Levina (+3=6-0)
1985	(France) Cannes	(Soviet Union) Elena Altsjoel	(Soviet Union) Ziwille Ringelene	(Soviet Union) Zoja Sadovskaja	tournament + match for the right to become challenger Zoja Sadovskaja – Ziwille Ringelene (+2=4-0)
1986	(Soviet Union) Minsk	(Soviet Union) Zoja Sadovskaja			match with Elena Altsjoel (+3=9-0)
1987	(Soviet Union) Minsk	(Soviet Union) Olga Levina	(Soviet Union) Elena Altsjoel	(Netherlands) Karen van Lith	tournament
1988	(Soviet Union) Yalta	(Soviet Union) Zoja Golubeva			match with Olga Levina (+3=7-0)
1989	(Netherlands) Rosmalen	(Soviet Union) Olga Levina	(Soviet Union) Zoja Golubeva (Soviet Union) Elena Altsjoel	------	tournament; Olga Levina took 22 points from 22
1990	(Soviet Union) Pitsunda	(Soviet Union) Zoja Golubeva			match with Olga Levina (+4=5-0)
1991	(Belarus) Minsk	(Latvia) Zoja Golubeva	(Soviet Union) Nina Jankovskaja	(Netherlands) Karen van Lith	tournament + match for the right to become challenger Nina Jankovskaja – Karen van Lith (+1=4-0)
1992	(Ukraine) Kyiv	(Latvia) Zoja Golubeva			match with Nina Jankovskaja (+4=5-0)
1993	(Netherlands) Brunssum	(Ukraine) Olga Levina	(Russia) Elena Chitaykina (Belarus) Olga Kamyshleeva	------	tournament
1994		(Latvia) Zoja Golubeva			match not played, title awarded
1995	(Mali) Bamako	(Latvia) Zoja Golubeva	(Netherlands) Karen van Lith	(Ukraine) Yulia Makarenkova	tournament
1996	(Netherlands) Vught	(Latvia) Zoja Golubeva			match with Karen van Lith (+2-1)
1997	(Poland) Mińsk Mazowiecki	(Latvia) Zoja Golubeva	(Belarus) Olga Kamyshleeva (Poland) Ewa Minkina	------	tournament + match for the right to become challenger Ewa Minkina – Olga Kamyshleeva (+2=4-0)
1999	(Russia) Yakutsk	(Latvia) Zoja Golubeva	(Netherlands) Nina Hoekman	(Russia) Tatiana Teterina	tournament + match Zoja Golubeva-Nina Hoekman-Tatiana Teterina (5:4:3)
2000	(Netherlands) Zutphen	(Latvia) Zoja Golubeva			match with Nina Hoekman (+3 sets, 0 set)
2001	(Netherlands) Velp	(Russia) Tamara Tansykkuzhina	(Ukraine) Olga Baltazhy	(Lithuania) Laima Pakuckiene	tournament
2002	(Latvia) Riga (Russia) Ufa	(Russia) Tamara Tansykkuzhina			match with Zoja Golubeva (+2 sets, -1 set)
2003	(Netherlands) Zoutelande	(Netherlands) Olga Kamyshleeva	(Latvia) Zoja Golubeva	(Ukraine) Olga Baltazhy	tournament
2004	(Russia) Ufa	(Russia) Tamara Tansykkuzhina			match with Olga Kamyshleeva (+2 sets, -1 set)
2005	(Italy) Latronico	(Ukraine) Darya Tkachenko	(Belarus) Irina Pashkevich	(Netherlands) Nina Hoekman	tournament
2006	(Russia) Yakutsk (Ukraine) Kyiv	(Ukraine) Darya Tkachenko			match with Tamara Tansykkuzhina (+2 sets, -1 set)
2007	(Russia) Yakutsk	(Russia) Tamara Tansykkuzhina	(Ukraine) Darya Tkachenko	(Russia) Marfa Nikitina	tournament
2008	(Ukraine) Dniprodzerzhynsk (Russia) Ufa	(Ukraine) Darya Tkachenko			match with Tamara Tansykkuzhina (+3 sets, 0 set)
2010	(Russia) Ufa	(Latvia) Zoja Golubeva	(Netherlands) Nina Hoekman	(Russia) Matrena Nogovitsyna	tournament
2011	(Ukraine) Dniprodzerzhynsk	(Ukraine) Darya Tkachenko			match with Zoja Golubeva (+2 sets, -1 set)
2011	(Ukraine) Rovno	(Russia) Tamara Tansykkuzhina	(Russia) Matrena Nogovitsyna	(Ukraine) Viktoriya Motrichko	tournament
2013	(Mongolia) Ulaanbaatar	(Latvia) Zoja Golubeva	(Ukraine) Darya Tkachenko	(Russia) Tamara Tansykkuzhina	tournament
2015	(Kazakhstan) Zerendi	(Latvia) Zoja Golubeva			match with (Russia) Tamara Tansykkuzhina (8:3:4:0—4:5:2:4)
2015	(China) Wǔhàn	(Latvia) Zoja Golubeva	(Poland) Natalia Sadowska	(Netherlands) Olga Kamyshleeva	tournament
2016	(Poland) Karpacz	(Poland) Natalia Sadowska			match with (Netherlands) Olga Kamyshleeva (refuse (Latvia) Zoja Golubeva)
2017	(Estonia) Tallinn	(Latvia) Zoja Golubeva	(Belarus) Olga Fedorovich	(Russia) Aygul Idrisova	tournament
2018	(Latvia) Riga	(Poland) Natalia Sadowska			match with (Latvia) Zoja Golubeva
2019	(Russia) Yakutsk	(Russia) Tamara Tansykkuzhina	(Russia) Aygul Idrisova	(Belarus) Darja Fedorovich	tournament
2021	(Poland) Warsaw	FMJD Tamara Tansykkuzhina			match with (Poland) Natalia Sadowska
2021	(Estonia) Tallinn	RDF Matrena Nogovitsyna	RDF Tamara Tansykkuzhina	(Ukraine) Viktoriya Motrichko	tournament
2023	(Curaçao) Willemstad	(Ukraine) Viktoriya Motrichko	FMJD Darya Tkachenko	(Ukraine) Olena Korotka	tournament
2024	(Netherlands) Wageningen	(Netherlands) Darya Tkachenko			match with (Ukraine) Viktoriya Motrichko
2025	(Trinidad and Tobago) Couva	(Ukraine) Viktoriya Motrichko	(China) Saiya Gangsuhe	(Ukraine) Yulia Makarenkova	swiss system
2026	(Estonia) Tallinn	(Ukraine) Viktoriya Motrichko			match with (Netherlands) Darya Tkachenko

== Rapid ==
Year	Host	Gold	Silver	Bronze
2012	(France) Lille	(Netherlands) Nina Hoekman	(Ukraine) Viktoriya Motrichko	(Russia) Aianika Kychkina
2013	(Mongolia) Ulaanbaatar	(Ukraine) Darya Tkachenko	(Ukraine) Viktoriya Motrichko	(Poland) Natalia Sadowska
2015	(Turkey) İzmir	(Russia) Matrena Nogovitsyna	(Russia) Tamara Tansykkuzhina	(Belarus) Olga Fedorovich
2016	(Turkey) İzmir	(Russia) Matrena Nogovitsyna	(Russia) Aygul Idrisova	(Russia) Tamara Tansykkuzhina
2017	(Turkey) İzmir	(Russia) Tamara Tansykkuzhina	(Ukraine) Olga Baltazhy	(Russia) Aygul Idrisova
2018	(Turkey) İzmir	(Russia) Matrena Nogovitsyna	(Ukraine) Viktoriya Motrichko	(Latvia) Zoja Golubeva
2019	(Netherlands) Beilen	(Russia) Tamara Tansykkuzhina	(Mongolia) Munkhtuya Nasanbayar	(Russia) Darya Tkachenko
2020	(Turkey) Antalya	(Russia) Aygul Idrisova	(Russia) Tamara Tansykkuzhina	(Russia) Christina Osipova
2021	(Poland) Julinek	(Poland) Natalia Sadowska	FMJD Darya Tkachenko	RDF Tamara Tansykkuzhina
2022	(Poland) Julinek	FMJD Darya Tkachenko	(Ukraine) Viktoriya Motrichko	(Netherlands) Fleur Kruysmulder
2023	(Poland) Julinek	(Latvia) Elena Chesnokova	(Netherlands) Darya Tkachenko	(Poland) Natalia Sadowska
2025	(China) Lishui	(China) You Zhang	(China) Saiya Gangsuhe	(Poland) Natalia Sadowska
2026	(China) Lishui	(Poland) Natalia Sadowska	(Netherlands) Yulia Bintsarovska	(Mongolia) Erdenesaikhan Daariimaa

== Blitz ==
Year	Host	Gold	Silver	Bronze
1999	(Netherlands) Rotterdam	(Latvia) Zoja Golubeva	(Russia) Tamara Tansykkuzhina	(Ukraine) Olga Baltazhy
2001	(Netherlands) Velp	(Netherlands) Nina Hoekman	(Netherlands) Olga Kamyshleeva	(Russia) Tamara Tansykkuzhina
2007	(Russia) Yakutsk	(Ukraine) Darya Tkachenko	(Russia) Elena Milshina	(Russia) Matrena Nogovitsyna
2009	(Germany) Berlin	(Latvia) Zoja Golubeva	(Netherlands) Nina Hoekman	(Russia) Olesya Abdullina
2011	(Russia) Ufa	(Latvia) Zoja Golubeva	(Ukraine) Darya Tkachenko	(Netherlands) Nina Hoekman
2012	(France) Lille	(Russia) Aygul Idrisova	(Russia) Matrena Nogovitsyna	(Ukraine) Olga Baltazhy
2013	(Mongolia) Ulaanbaatar	(Russia) Matrena Nogovitsyna	(Ukraine) Viktoriya Motrichko	(Ukraine) Darya Tkachenko
2015	(Turkey) İzmir	(Ukraine) Olga Baltazhy	(Russia) Tamara Tansykkuzhina	FMJD Darya Tkachenko
2016	(Turkey) İzmir	(Russia) Aygul Idrisova	(Russia) Tamara Tansykkuzhina	(Russia) Matrena Nogovitsyna
2017	(Turkey) İzmir	(Russia) Matrena Nogovitsyna	(Belarus) Olga Fedorovich	(Russia) Tamara Tansykkuzhina
2018	(Turkey) İzmir	(Belarus) Darja Fedorovich	(Russia) Tamara Tansykkuzhina	(Ukraine) Viktoriya Motrichko
2019	(Latvia) Riga	(Russia) Agata Parahina	(Russia) Nika Leopoldova	(Ukraine) Viktoriya Motrichko
2020	(Turkey) Antalya	(Russia) Alia Aminova	(Russia) Matrena Nogovitsyna	(Russia) Aygul Idrisova
2021	(Poland) Julinek	RDF Aygul Idrisova	RDF Tamara Tansykkuzhina	(Belarus) Maria Chesnokova
2022	(Latvia) Riga	(Ukraine) Viktoriya Motrichko	(Latvia) Elena Chesnokova	(Poland) Natalia Sadowska
2023	(China) Lishui	(China) You Zhang	(Poland) Natalia Sadowska	(Latvia) Valda Vasariete
2024	(China) Lishui	(Poland) Natalia Sadowska	(China) You Zhang	(Poland) Marta Bankowska
2025	(Netherlands) Hoogeveen	(Netherlands) Darya Tkachenko	(Poland) Natalia Sadowska	(Ukraine) Viktoriya Motrichko
2026	(Latvia) Riga	(Ukraine) Viktoriya Motrichko	(Poland) Natalia Sadowska	(Ukraine) Vasylysa Kutsenko

== Superblitz ==
Year	Host	Gold	Silver	Bronze
2025	(Netherlands) Hoogeveen	(Poland) Natalia Sadowska	(Netherlands) Lisa Scholtens	(Ukraine) Viktoriya Motrichko

== See also ==
- List of women's Draughts World Championship winners
- Draughts World Championship
