= List of women's Draughts World Championship winners =

The Draughts World Championship is the world championship in international draughts, since 1973 organised among women by the World Draughts Federation (FMJD). Since 1981 the championship occurs every two years. In the even year following the tournament must take place the World Title match.

The first began in 1973 in the Netherlands and has had winners from the Soviet Union, Latvia, Ukraine, and Russia. The current women's champion is Viktoriya Motrichko, she previously didn't win the championship.

Year	Host	Winner
1973	(Netherlands) Amsterdam	(Soviet Union) Elena Mikhailovskaya
1974	(Netherlands) Amsterdam	(Soviet Union) Elena Mikhailovskaya
1975	(Netherlands) Amsterdam	(Soviet Union) Elena Mikhailovskaya
1976	(Netherlands) Amsterdam	(Soviet Union) Elena Mikhailovskaya
1977	(Netherlands) Amsterdam	(Soviet Union) Elena Mikhailovskaya
1979	(Netherlands) Sneek (Soviet Union) Minsk (barrage)	(Soviet Union) Ludmilla Meijler-Sochnenko
1980	(Netherlands) De Lier (Nederland)	(Soviet Union) Elena Altsjoel
1981	(Soviet Union) Riga (Latvia)	(Soviet Union) Olga Levina
1982 (match)	(Soviet Union) Moscow	(Soviet Union) Elena Altsjoel
1983	(Poland) Sandomierz	(Soviet Union) Elena Altsjoel
1984 (match)	(Soviet Union) Tallinn	(Soviet Union) Elena Altsjoel
1985	(France) Cannes	(Soviet Union) Elena Altsjoel
1986 (match)	(Soviet Union) Minsk	(Soviet Union) Zoja Golubeva
1987	(Soviet Union) Minsk	(Soviet Union) Olga Levina
1988 (match)	(Soviet Union) Yalta	(Soviet Union) Zoja Golubeva
1989	(Netherlands) Rosmalen	(Soviet Union) Olga Levina
1990 (match)	(Soviet Union) Pitsunda	(Soviet Union) Zoja Golubeva
1991	(Belarus) Minsk	(Latvia) Zoja Golubeva
1992 (match)	(Ukraine) Kyiv	(Latvia) Zoja Golubeva
1993	(Netherlands) Brunssum	(Ukraine) Olga Levina
1994 (match)	Not held	(Latvia) Zoja Golubeva
1995	(Mali) Bamako	(Latvia) Zoja Golubeva
1996 (match)	(Netherlands) Vught	(Latvia) Zoja Golubeva
1997	(Poland) Mińsk Mazowiecki	(Latvia) Zoja Golubeva
1999	(Russia) Yakutsk	(Latvia) Zoja Golubeva
2000 (match)	Zutphen (Netherlands)	(Latvia) Zoja Golubeva
2001	(Netherlands) Velp	(Russia) Tamara Tansykkuzhina
2002 (match)	(Latvia) and (Russia)	(Russia) Tamara Tansykkuzhina
2003	(Netherlands) Zoutelande	(Netherlands) Olga Kamyshleeva
2004 (match)	(Russia) Ufa	(Russia) Tamara Tansykkuzhina
2005	(Italy) Latronico	(Ukraine) Darya Tkachenko
2006 (match)	(Russia) and (Ukraine)	(Ukraine) Darya Tkachenko
2007	(Russia) Yakutsk	(Russia) Tamara Tansykkuzhina
2008 (match)	(Ukraine) and (Russia)	(Ukraine) Darya Tkachenko
2010	(Russia) Ufa	(Latvia) Zoja Golubeva
2011 (match)	(Ukraine) Rivne	(Russia) Tamara Tansykkuzhina
2013	(Mongolia) Ulaanbaatar	(Latvia) Zoja Golubeva
2015 (match)	(Kazakhstan) Zerendi	(Latvia) Zoja Golubeva
2015	(China) Wuhan	(Latvia) Zoja Golubeva
2016 (match)	(Poland) Karpacz	(Poland) Natalia Sadowska
2017	(Estonia) Tallinn	(Latvia) Zoja Golubeva
2018 (match)	(Latvia) Riga	(Poland) Natalia Sadowska
2019	(Russia) Yakutsk	(Russia) Tamara Tansykkuzhina
2021 (match)	(Poland) Warsaw	FMJD Tamara Tansykkuzhina
2021	(Estonia) Tallinn	(Russia) Matrena Nogovitsyna
2023	(Curaçao) Willemstad	(Ukraine) Viktoriya Motrichko
2024 (match)	(Netherlands) Wageningen	(Netherlands) Darya Tkachenko
2025	(Trinidad and Tobago) Couva	(Ukraine) Viktoriya Motrichko

== See also ==
- List of Draughts World Championship winners
- World Checkers/Draughts Championship
