= European Women's Draughts Championship =

The European Women's Draughts Championship is the European championship in international draughts for women, organized since 2000 by the European Draughts Confederation. An annual blitz championship has been held since 2008, and an annual rapid championship since 2012. A team championship has been organized since 2010, with team blitz and team rapid competitions added in 2013. Youth championships are also held in the U27, U19, U16, U13, and U10 categories.

== Classical ==
Number	Year	Format	Location	Gold	Silver	Bronze
1	2000	Swiss system	(Ukraine) Zaporizhia	(Russia) Tamara Tansykkuzhina	(Ukraine) Olga Baltazhy	(Netherlands) Olga Kamyshleeva
2	2002	Swiss system	(Lithuania) Vilnius	(Netherlands) Tanja Chub	(Ukraine) Olga Baltazhy	(Russia) Elena Milshina
3	2004	Swiss system	(Poland) Mława	(Ukraine) Darya Tkachenko	(Russia) Elena Milshina	(Russia) Matrena Nogovitsyna
4	2006	Swiss system	(Slovenia) Bovec	(Ukraine) Darya Tkachenko	(Netherlands) Nina Hoekman	(Russia) Tamara Tansykkuzhina
5	2008	Swiss system	(Estonia) Tallinn	(Russia) Tamara Tansykkuzhina	(Ukraine) Darya Tkachenko	(Russia) Matrena Nogovitsyna
6	2010	Swiss system	(Poland) Sępólno Krajeńskie	(Latvia) Zoja Golubeva	(Russia) Tamara Tansykkuzhina	(Poland) Natalia Sadowska
7	2012	Swiss system	(Netherlands) Emmen	(Latvia) Zoja Golubeva	(Netherlands) Nina Hoekman	(Russia) Ayyyna Sobakina
8	2014	Swiss system	(Estonia) Tallinn	(Ukraine) Olga Baltazhy	(Russia) Tamara Tansykkuzhina	(Latvia) Zoja Golubeva
9	2016	Swiss system	(Turkey) İzmir	(Russia) Aygul Idrisova	(Russia) Ksenia Nakhova	(Russia) Matrena Nogovitsyna
10	2018	Swiss system	(Russia) Moscow	(Russia) Matrena Nogovitsyna	(Russia) Natalia Shestakova	(Russia) Elena Milshina
11	2022	Swiss system	(Belgium) Kortrijk	(Poland) Natalia Sadowska	(Poland) Marta Bankowska	(Ukraine) Viktoriya Motrichko
12	2024	Swiss system	(Italy) Chianciano Terme	(Ukraine) Viktoriya Motrichko	(Netherlands) Darya Tkachenko	(Poland) Natalia Sadowska
13	2026	Swiss system	(Netherlands) Beilen	(Ukraine) Yulia Makarenkova	(Ukraine) Viktoriya Motrichko	(Latvia) Alise Misane

== Rapid ==
Number	Year	Format	Location	Gold	Silver	Bronze
1	2012	Swiss system	(Estonia) Tallinn	(Russia) Tamara Tansykkuzhina	(Russia) Ayyyna Sobakina	(Russia) Nika Leopoldova
2	2013	Unknown	(Slovenia) Bovec	(Russia) Aygul Idrisova	Unknown	Unknown
3	2014	Round-robin	(Czech Republic) Prague	(Ukraine) Viktoriya Motrichko	(Russia) Tamara Tansykkuzhina	(Ukraine) Lyudmila Litvinenko
4	2015	Swiss system	(Italy) Bacoli	(Poland) Natalia Sadowska	FMJD Darya Tkachenko	(Latvia) Zoja Golubeva
5	2016	Swiss system	(Turkey) İzmir	(Russia) Tamara Tansykkuzhina	(Russia) Natalia Shestakova	(Belarus) Darja Fedorovich
6	2017	Swiss system	(Poland) Karpacz	(Russia) Aianika Kolodeznikova-Kychkina	(Poland) Natalia Sadowska	(Ukraine) Viktoriya Motrichko
7	2018	Swiss system	(Israel) Netanya	(Latvia) Zoja Golubeva	(Belarus) Olga Fedorovich	(Russia) Matrena Nogovitsyna
8	2019	Swiss system	(Israel) Netanya	(Ukraine) Viktoriya Motrichko	(Belarus) Olga Fedorovich	(Russia) Tunaaraa Fedorova
9	2021	Swiss system	(Italy) Chianciano Terme	(Ukraine) Viktoriya Motrichko	(Russia) Matrena Nogovitsyna	(Belarus) Olga Fedorovich
10	2022	Round-robin	(Netherlands) Hijken	(Poland) Natalia Sadowska	(Poland) Marta Bankowska	(Ukraine) Viktoriya Motrichko
11	2023	Round-robin	(Netherlands) Beilen	(Netherlands) Darya Tkachenko	(Poland) Natalia Sadowska	(Ukraine) Vira Popruha
12	2024	Swiss system	(Italy) Chianciano Terme	(Latvia) Zoja Golubeva	(Ukraine) Olena Korotka	(Netherlands) Lisa Scholtens
13	2025	Swiss system	(Belgium) Brussels	(Poland) Natalia Sadowska	(Ukraine) Anastasiia Glushko	(Ukraine) Viktoriya Motrichko
14	2026	Swiss system	(Netherlands) Beilen	(Ukraine) Viktoriya Motrichko	(Poland) Natalia Sadowska	(Poland) Marta Bankowska

== Blitz ==
Number	Year	Format	Location	Gold	Silver	Bronze
1	2008	Round-robin	(Bulgaria) Varna	(Russia) Tamara Tansykkuzhina	(Ukraine) Olga Baltazhy	(Latvia) Zoja Golubeva
2	2009	Round-robin	(Sweden) Stockholm	(Russia) Natalia Shestakova	(Russia) Irina Platonova	(Russia) Olesia Abdullina
3	2010	Round-robin	(Lithuania) Vilnius	(Russia) Tamara Tansykkuzhina	(Russia) Irina Platonova	(Latvia) Zoja Golubeva
4	2011	Round-robin	(Estonia) Tallinn	(Russia) Tamara Tansykkuzhina	(Ukraine) Viktoriya Motrichko	(Netherlands) Nina Hoekman
5	2012	Round-robin	(Sweden) Stockholm	(Russia) Matrena Nogovitsyna	(Russia) Tamara Tansykkuzhina	(Ukraine) Olga Baltazhy
6	2013	Round-robin	(Hungary) Budapest	(Ukraine) Darya Tkachenko	(Ukraine) Viktoriya Motrichko	(Russia) Aygul Idrisova
7	2014	Swiss system	(Estonia) Tallinn	(Russia) Matrena Nogovitsyna (Russia) Tamara Tansykkuzhina	---------	(Russia) Irina Platonova
8	2015	Round-robin	(France) Cannes	(Latvia) Zoja Golubeva	(Russia) Matrena Nogovitsyna	(Russia) Tamara Tansykkuzhina
9	2016	Swiss system	(Turkey) İzmir	(Russia) Matrena Nogovitsyna	(Russia) Darya Tkachenko	(Russia) Natalia Shestakova
10	2017	Round-robin	(France) Cannes	(Russia) Natalia Shestakova	(Ukraine) Viktoriya Motrichko	(Russia) Anna Chuprova
11	2018	Swiss system	(Israel) Netanya	(Ukraine) Viktoriya Motrichko	(Russia) Aygul Idrisova	(Belarus) Olga Fedorovich
12	2019	Swiss system	(Israel) Netanya	(Ukraine) Viktoriya Motrichko	(Latvia) Elena Cesnokova	(Russia) Matrena Nogovitsyna
13	2021	Swiss system	(Italy) Chianciano Terme	(Russia) Aygul Idrisova	(Ukraine) Olga Baltazhy	(Poland) Natalia Sadowska
14	2022	Swiss system	(Netherlands) Hijken	(Poland) Natalia Sadowska	(Ukraine) Viktoriya Motrichko	(Poland) Marta Bankowska
15	2023	Round-robin	(Netherlands) Beilen	(Poland) Natalia Sadowska	(Lithuania) Laima Adlyte	(Netherlands) Marijke Koers
16	2024	Swiss system	(Italy) Chianciano Terme	(Netherlands) Darya Tkachenko	(Poland) Marta Bankowska	(Poland) Natalia Sadowska
17	2025	Swiss system	(Belgium) Brussels	(Latvia) Zoja Golubeva	(Poland) Marta Bankowska	(Ukraine) Viktoriya Motrichko
18	2026	Swiss system	(Belgium) Brussels	(Poland) Natalia Sadowska	(Poland) Marta Bankowska	(Ukraine) Viktoriya Motrichko

== Superblitz ==
Number	Year	Format	Location	Gold	Silver	Bronze
1	2016	Swiss system	(Turkey) İzmir	(Russia) Matrena Nogovitsyna	(Russia) Darya Tkachenko	(Russia) Tamara Tansykkuzhina
2	2018	Swiss system	(Russia) Moscow	(Russia) Matrena Nogovitsyna	(Russia) Natalia Shestakova	(Russia) Elena Milshina

== See also ==
- European Draughts Championship
