= 2015 Women's World Draughts Championship =

Draughts tournament

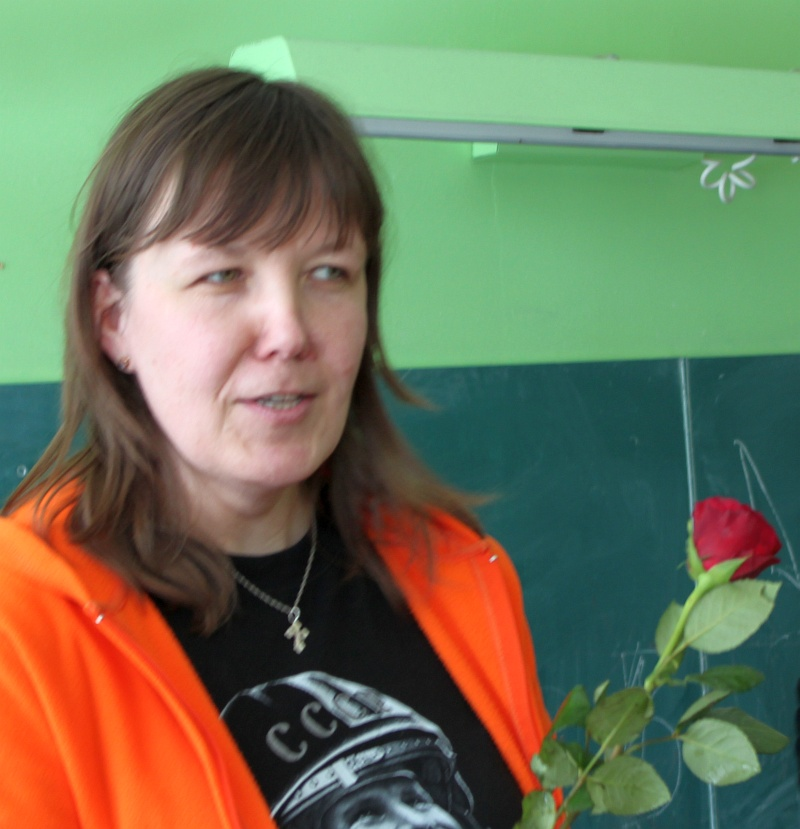
- 2015 Women's World Draughts Champion Zoja Golubeva

Tournament information
- Location: Wuhan, China
- Dates: 11 May–24 May
- Administrator: FMJD
- Tournament format: Round-robin tournament
- Venue: Hubei Zhonghe International Hotel

Final positions
- Champion: Zoja Golubeva
- Runner-up: Natalia Sadowska

The 2015 Women's World Draughts Championship in international draughts was held from 11–24 May, 2015 at the Hubei Zhonghe International Hotel in Wuhan, China. It was held under the auspices of the International Draughts Federation (FMJD). It was played as 15-round round-robin tournament. The total prize money for the tournament was 20,000 euros.

Zoja Golubeva won the tournament to become the women's world champion.

== Participants ==
The sixteen participants were nominated according to a schema and rules accepted by the FMJD General Assembly:

Number	Title	Name	Country	Qualification Path
1	GMIF, MI	Zoja Golubeva	Latvia	World Champion
2	GMIF, MI	Tamara Tansykkuzhina	Russia	Challenger
3		You Zhang	China	Organisation place
4	MIF	Hanqing Zhao	China	Sponsors place
5		Enkhtuul Dondov	Mongolia	FMJD Wild Card
6	MIF	Alatenghua	China	Asian Champion
7		Odgerel Molomjamts	Mongolia	Asian Championship #2
8	MIF	Laima Adlytė	Lithuania	Instead of Africa Champion
9	MFF	Marika Azojan	Estonia	Instead of America Champion
10	GMIF, MF	Olga Baltazhy	Ukraine	Europe #1
11	GMIF	Viktoriya Motrichko	Ukraine	Europe #2
12	MIF	Nika Leopoldova	Russia	Europe #3
13	MIF	Aigul Idrisova	Russia	Europe #4
14	GMIF, MF	Olga Fedorovich	Belarus	Europe #5
15	MIF, MF	Natalia Sadowska	Poland	Europe #6
16	GMIF	Olga Kamyshleeva	Netherlands	Rating on 1 January, 2015

=== Reserve players ===
Number	Title	Name	Country
1	GMIF	Matrena Nogovitsyna	Russia
2	GMIF	Darya Tkachenko	Ukraine
3	MIF	Vitalia Doumesh	Netherlands
4	MIF	Darja Fedorovich	Belarus
5	MIF	Heike Verheul	Netherlands
6	MIF	Olesia Abdoullina	Latvia
7	MFF	Arleta Flisikowska	Poland
8	GMIF	Erdenetsogt Mandakhnaran	Mongolia

== Rules and regulations ==
The games were played with the official FMJD classical time control: 80 minutes plus a 1-minute increment per move. FMJD regulations prohibited players from agreeing to a draw before each had completed 40 moves; doing so required the referee to award both players 0 points.

The final rankings were determined by total points. If two or more players finished with the same score, the following tiebreaks were applied:

1. Number of wins.
2. Results in the direct encounters between the tied players.
3. Results obtained against opponents in order of their final ranking.

== Results ==
Place	Name	Country	Title	Rating	1	2	3	4	5	6	7	8	9	10	11	12	13	14	15	16	Points	Wins	Draws	Losses	Coeff.
1	Zoja Golubeva	Latvia	GMIF	2262	*	1	1	1	1	2	1	0	2	1	1	1	2	2	2	2	20	6	8	1	268
2	Natalia Sadowska	Poland	MIF	2179	1	*	0	1	1	2	2	1	1	1	1	2	2	2	1	2	20	6	8	1	274
3	Olga Kamyshleeva	Netherlands	GMIF	2251	1	2	*	1	1	1	1	1	2	1	1	2	1	1	2	2	20	5	10	0	281
4	Olga Fedorovich	Belarus	GMIF	2190	1	1	1	*	1	1	0	1	2	2	2	2	0	2	1	2	19	6	7	2	265
5	Tamara Tansykkuzhina	Russia	GMIF	2257	1	1	1	1	*	1	1	1	1	2	2	1	2	2	2	0	19	5	9	1	270
6	Aygul Idrisova	Russia	MIF	2199	0	0	1	1	1	*	1	1	1	2	0	2	2	2	2	2	18	6	6	3	228
7	Hanqing Zhao	China	MIF	2058	1	0	1	2	1	1	*	2	2	0	2	1	2	1	1	1	18	5	8	2	262
8	Nika Leopoldova	Russia	MIF	2169	2	1	1	1	1	1	0	*	1	1	1	1	1	1	2	2	17	3	11	1	238
9	Yulia Makarenkova	Ukraine	MIF	2127	0	1	0	0	1	1	0	1	*	1	2	1	2	1	2	2	15	4	7	4	185
10	Olga Baltazhy	Ukraine	GMIF	2165	1	1	1	0	0	0	2	1	1	*	1	1	1	2	1	2	15	3	9	3	202
11	Laima Adlyte	Lithuania	MIF	2087	1	1	1	0	0	2	0	1	0	1	*	2	2	1	1	1	14	3	8	4	196
12	Alatenghua	China	MIF	2041	1	0	0	0	1	0	1	1	1	1	0	*	1	2	2	2	13	3	7	5	158
13	You Zhang	China		1850	0	0	1	2	0	0	0	1	0	1	0	1	*	1	2	1	10	2	6	7	132
14	Odgerel Molomjamts	Mongolia		1974	0	0	1	0	0	0	1	1	1	0	1	0	1	*	1	2	9	1	7	7	113
15	Marika Azojan	Estonia	MFF	1998	0	1	0	1	0	0	1	0	0	1	1	0	0	1	*	1	7	0	7	8	101
16	Enkhtuul Dondov	Mongolia		1956	0	0	0	0	2	0	1	0	0	0	1	0	1	0	1	*	6	1	4	10	87

== See also ==
- List of women's Draughts World Championship winners
- Women's World Draughts Championship
