= 2017 Women's World Draughts Championship =

Draughts tournament

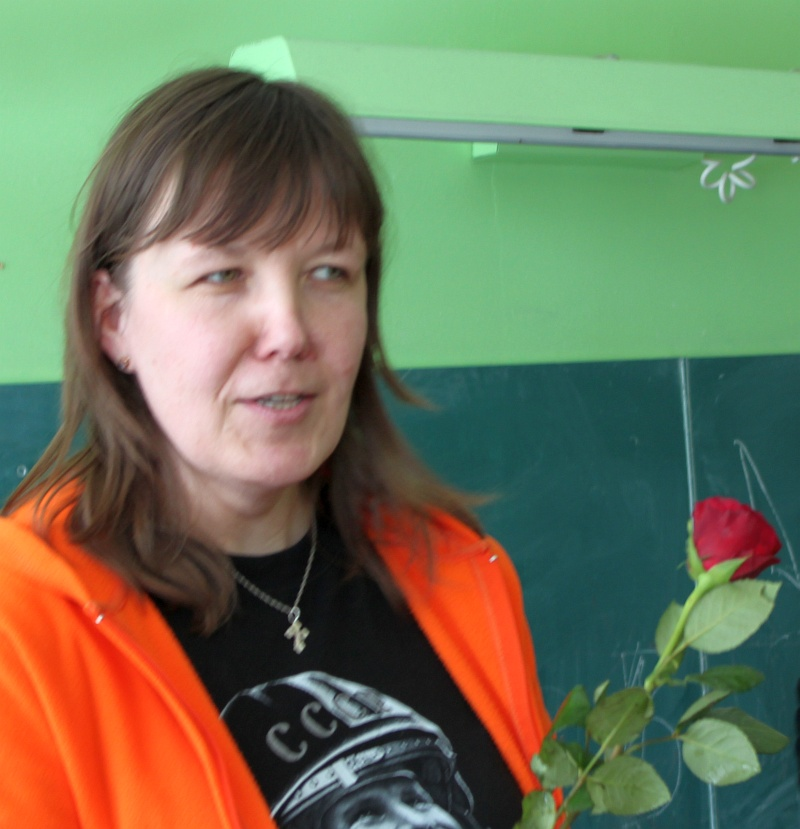
- 2017 Women's World Draughts Champion Zoja Golubeva

Tournament information
- Location: Tallinn, Estonia
- Dates: 1 October–15 October
- Administrator: FMJD
- Tournament format: Round-robin tournament
- Venue(s): Hotel Euroopa, Paul Keres Chess House

Final positions
- Champion: Zoja Golubeva
- Runner-up: Olga Fedorovich

The 2017 Women's World Draughts Championship in international draughts was held from 1–15 October, 2017 in Tallinn, Estonia. It was held under the auspieces of the International Draughts Federation (FMJD). The championship was played as a 15-round round-robin tournament.

Three rounds were played in the Hotel Euroopa, while the others were played at the Paul Keres Chess House. The total prize money for the tournament was 20,000 euros. The 2017 World Draughts Championship took place simultaneously at the same locations.

Reigning Women's World Draughts Champion Natalia Sadowska and former champion Zoja Golubeva participated in the championship. Zoja Golubeva won the tournament and became the women's world champion.

== Rules and regulations ==
The games were played with the official FMJD classical time control: 80 minutes plus a 1-minute increment per move. FMJD regulations prohibited players from agreeing to a draw before each had completed 40 moves; doing so required the referee to award both players 0 points.

The final rankings were determined by total points. If two or more players finished with the same score, the following tiebreaks were applied:

1. Number of wins.
2. Results in the direct encounters between the tied players.
3. Results obtained against opponents in order of their final ranking.

== Schedule ==
Date	Time	Event	Playing venue
1 October	11:00	Opening	Hotel Euroopa
1 October	15:00	Round 1	Hotel Euroopa
2 October	9:00	Round 2	Hotel Euroopa
3 October	16:00	Round 3	Hotel Euroopa
4 October	16:00	Round 4	Paul Keres Chess House
5 October	16:00	Round 5	Paul Keres Chess House
6 October	9:00	Round 6	Paul Keres Chess House
6 October	16:00	Round 7	Paul Keres Chess House
7 October		Rest day	
8 October	16:00	Round 8	Paul Keres Chess House
9 October	16:00	Round 9	Paul Keres Chess House
10 October	16:00	Round 10	Paul Keres Chess House
11 October	16:00	Round 11	Paul Keres Chess House
12 October	16:00	Round 12	Paul Keres Chess House
13 October	16:00	Round 13	Paul Keres Chess House
14 October	9:00	Round 14	Paul Keres Chess House
15 October	9:00	Round 15	Paul Keres Chess House
15 October	17:00	Closing	Paul Keres Chess House

== Results ==
Place	Name	Country	Title	Rating	1	2	3	4	5	6	7	8	9	10	11	12	13	14	15	16	Points	Wins	Draws	Losses
1	Zoja Golubeva	Latvia	GMIF	2228	*	1	1	1	1	1	1	2	1	1	1	2	2	2	2	2	21	6	9	0
2	Olga Fedorovich	Belarus	GMIF	2211	1	*	1	1	1	1	2	1	1	1	1	1	2	2	2	2	20	5	10	0
3	Aygul Idrisova	Russia	GMIF	2211	1	1	*	1	1	1	2	1	0	1	2	1	2	1	2	2	19	5	9	1
4	Natalia Sadowska	Poland	GMIF	2216	1	1	1	*	1	1	1	1	1	2	1	1	1	2	2	2	19	4	11	0
5	Darja Fedorovich	Belarus	MIF	2141	1	1	1	1	*	0	2	1	2	1	1	2	0	1	2	2	18	5	8	2
6	Elena Cesnokova	Latvia	MFF	2154	1	1	1	1	2	*	1	1	1	1	1	1	1	2	2	1	18	3	12	0
7	Vitalia Doumesh	Netherlands	MIF	2144	1	0	0	1	0	1	*	1	1	2	1	2	1	2	2	2	17	5	7	3
8	Heike Verheul	Netherlands	MIF	2115	0	1	1	1	1	1	1	*	1	1	1	2	1	2	1	2	17	3	11	1
9	Olga Baltazhy	Ukraine	GMIF	2189	1	1	2	1	0	1	1	1	*	0	2	1	2	0	1	2	16	4	8	3
10	Nyamjargal Munkhbaatar	Mongolia	GMIF	1987	1	1	1	0	1	1	0	1	2	*	1	1	1	1	2	2	16	3	10	2
11	Yulia Makarenkova	Ukraine	MIF	2157	1	1	0	1	1	1	1	1	0	1	*	1	1	2	2	2	16	3	10	2
12	Ksenia Nakhova	Russia	GMIF	2102	0	1	1	1	0	1	0	0	1	1	1	*	2	1	2	2	14	3	8	4
13	Zane Magone	Latvia	MFF	2018	0	0	0	1	2	1	1	1	0	1	1	0	*	1	1	1	11	1	9	5
14	Odgerel Molomjamts	Mongolia	MIF	2012	0	0	1	0	1	0	0	0	2	1	0	1	1	*	1	2	10	2	6	7
15	Merilii Jalg	Estonia		1912	0	0	0	0	0	0	0	1	1	0	0	0	1	1	*	1	5	0	5	10
16	Triinu Jalg	Estonia		1906	0	0	0	0	0	1	0	0	0	0	0	0	1	0	1	*	3	0	3	12

* GMIF — women's international grandmaster

* MIF — women's international master

* MFF — master FMJD

== See also ==
- List of women's Draughts World Championship winners
- Women's World Draughts Championship
