= Viktoriya Motrichko =

Ukrainian draughts player (born 1989)

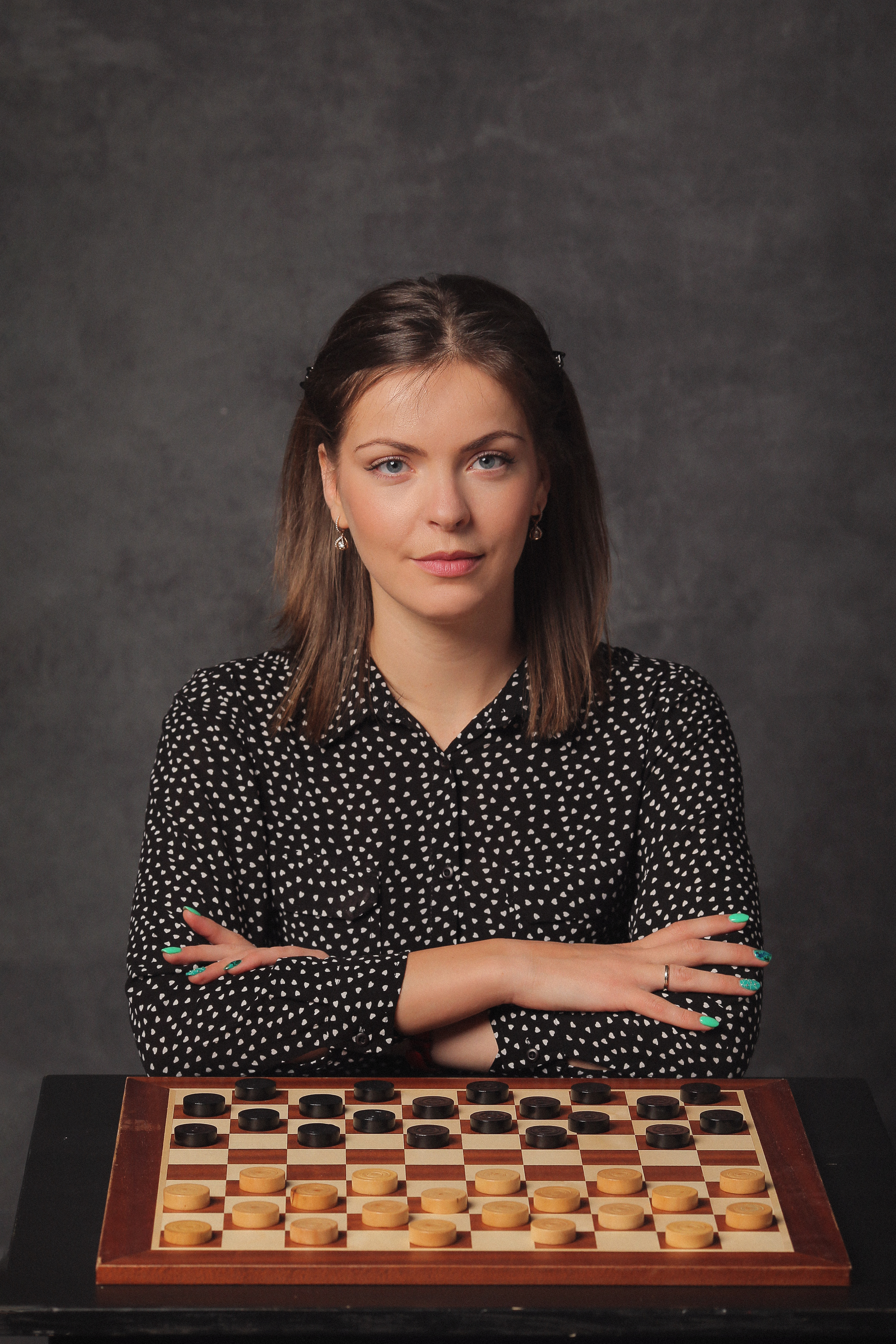

Personal information
- Full name: Вікторія Леонтіївна Мотрічко
- Nationality: Ukrainian
- Born: March 10, 1989 (age 37) Odesa, Ukrainian SSR

Sport
- Sport: Draughts
- Club: Heijmans Excelsior (Netherlands)
- Team: Ukraine
- Coached by: Heorhiy Podstavkin; Anatoli Gantvarg

Achievements and titles
- World finals: International draughts: 2023, 2025 champion International draughts, blitz: 2022, 2026 champion Brazilian draughts: 2007 champion
- Regional finals: European champion, international draughts: 2024; European champion, rapid: 2014, 2019, 2021, 2026; European champion, blitz: 2018, 2019
- National finals: Ukrainian championships, Russian checkers: 2005, 2010 champion Ukrainian championships, International draughts: 2006, 2013–2016, 2018 champion
- Highest world ranking: No. 1 in the FMJD women's rating list (classical: October 2017, April 2023; blitz: from January 2020)
- Personal bests: Peak FMJD rating: 2287 (classical, January 2024), 2314 (blitz, October 2022)
Medal record
Representing Ukraine
Draughts
World Mind Sports Games
Gold medal – first place	2008 Beijing	Russian draughts
World championships
Silver medal – second place	Dnipropetrovsk 2005	Russian draughts
Gold medal – first place	Nidzica 2007	Brazilian draughts
Bronze medal – third place	Rubizhne 2009	Russian draughts
Bronze medal – third place	Rivne 2011	International draughts
Bronze medal – third place	Saint Petersburg 2011	Russian draughts
Bronze medal – third place	Tallinn 2021	International draughts
Gold medal – first place	Willemstad 2023	International draughts
Gold medal – first place	Couva 2025	International draughts
World title match
Silver medal – second place	Wageningen 2024	International draughts
World rapid and blitz championships
Silver medal – second place	Lille 2012	International draughts, rapid
Silver medal – second place	Ulaanbaatar 2013	International draughts, rapid
Silver medal – second place	Ulaanbaatar 2013	International draughts, blitz
Silver medal – second place	Bergamo 2018	International draughts, rapid
Bronze medal – third place	Bergamo 2018	International draughts, blitz
Bronze medal – third place	Riga 2019	International draughts, blitz
Gold medal – first place	Riga 2022	International draughts, blitz
Silver medal – second place	Julinek 2022	International draughts, rapid
Gold medal – first place	Riga 2026	International draughts, blitz
European championships
Silver medal – second place	Sunny Beach 2010	Russian draughts
Silver medal – second place	Suzdal 2012	Russian draughts
Silver medal – second place	Budapest 2013	International draughts, blitz
Gold medal – first place	Prague 2014	International draughts, rapid
Silver medal – second place	Cannes 2017	International draughts, blitz
Bronze medal – third place	Karpacz 2017	International draughts, rapid
Gold medal – first place	Netanya 2018	International draughts, blitz
Gold medal – first place	Netanya 2019	International draughts, rapid
Gold medal – first place	Netanya 2019	International draughts, blitz
Gold medal – first place	Chianciano Terme 2021	International draughts, rapid
Bronze medal – third place	Kortrijk 2022	International draughts
Bronze medal – third place	Beilen 2022	International draughts, rapid
Silver medal – second place	Beilen 2022	International draughts, blitz
Gold medal – first place	Chianciano Terme 2024	International draughts
Silver medal – second place	Beilen 2026	International draughts
Gold medal – first place	Beilen 2026	International draughts, rapid
Bronze medal – third place	Beilen 2026	International draughts, blitz
SportAccord World Mind Games / IMSA Elite Mind Games
Silver medal – second place	Beijing 2012	International draughts
Gold medal – first place	Beijing 2014	International draughts, superblitz
Silver medal – second place	Beijing 2014	International draughts, rapid
Bronze medal – third place	Huai'an 2016	International draughts, blitz
Silver medal – second place	Huai'an 2017	International draughts, blitz
Silver medal – second place	Huai'an 2017	International draughts, rapid
Silver medal – second place	Hengshui 2019	International draughts, rapid
FMJD World Cup (overall standings)
Bronze medal – third place	2017	International draughts
Silver medal – second place	2018	International draughts
Bronze medal – third place	2019	International draughts
Silver medal – second place	2020	International draughts
Bronze medal – third place	2022	International draughts
Silver medal – second place	2023	International draughts
Silver medal – second place	2024	International draughts
Bronze medal – third place	2025	International draughts

Viktoriya Leontyivna Motrichko (Ukrainian: Вікторія Леонтіївна Мотрічко; born March 10, 1989 in Odesa, Ukrainian SSR) is a Ukrainian draughts player, an International Grandmaster since 2005. She was the World champion in International draughts in 2023 and 2025, World blitz champion in International draughts in 2022 and 2026, World champion in Brazilian draughts in 2007 and the winner of the World Mind Sports Games in Russian checkers in 2008. She won the European Women's Draughts Championship in 2024 and has won several European titles in rapid and blitz. She has repeatedly topped the FMJD women's rating list and finished in the top three of the FMJD World Cup overall standings eight times between 2017 and 2025.

== Junior career ==
Viktoriya Motrichko started playing draughts at the age of 10 and initially specialized in draughts-64 (Russian and Brazilian versions). In these two variants she won numerous World and European junior championships starting 2002 when she became World and European champion among mini-cadets. In the following years she won 9 more European and 6 more World titles.

== Senior career ==
=== 2005–2008 ===
In 2005 Motrichko won senior Ukrainian championship in Russian checkers. The same year she took a silver medal at the senior World championships in Dnipropetrovsk with the same result as the champion, Elena Miskova from Moldova. In 2006 she won the Ukrainian championship in International draughts.

Viktoriya's best results came in 2007 and 2008. First, being only 18 years old, she won the first World Women Championships in Brazilian draughts in Nidzica (Poland), and the next year she took the gold medal in Russian checkers at the World Mind Sports Games in Beijing while defeating Miskova in the final barrage. In 2008 she also became World junior vice-champion in International draughts.

=== 2009–2010 ===
In 2009 Motrichko added a third senior World championships medal to her collection, winning a bronze at the World Russian checkers championship in Rubizhne (Ukraine), and in 2010 she became a silver medalist at the European senior championships in Varna. In 2010 she also won her second Ukrainian title in Russian checkers.

In International draughts she finished in the upper half of the table at the World and European blitz championships (Berlin 2009, Vilnius 2010) and at the 2010 European Championship, where she defeated the reigning world champion Darya Tkachenko in the Swiss-system tournament.

=== 2011–2016 ===
In autumn 2011 in Rivne Motrichko won her first senior World championship medal in International draughts, a bronze behind the Russians Tamara Tansykkuzhina and Matrena Nogovitsyna and ahead of the previous world champion Tkachenko. The same year she won another bronze at the World Russian draughts championship in Saint Petersburg, and in 2012 she added a second European silver medal in Russian draughts. At the SportAccord World Mind Games 2012 in Beijing she finished second behind Nogovitsyna.

In 2013 she won silver at the European blitz championship and two silver medals at the World rapid and blitz championships. From 2013 she won the Ukrainian championship in International draughts four years in a row. In June 2014 she became European rapid champion in Prague, and at the 2014 SportAccord World Mind Games in Beijing she won gold in superblitz and silver in rapid.

In 2016 she took bronze at the IMSA Elite Mind Games in Huai'an, China, and won all three disciplines (classical, rapid and blitz) at the Ukrainian championship.

=== 2017–2022 ===
Returning to competition after the birth of her daughter, Motrichko started 2017 in 10th place on the FMJD rating list. She was the best woman at the Turkish Open and the second-best woman at the Golden Prague and Polish Open tournaments, won silver at the European blitz championship in Cannes and bronze at the European rapid championship in Karpacz, and finished third in the 2017 FMJD World Cup overall standings. On 1 October 2017 she topped the FMJD women's rating list for the first time.

Since September 2018 she has played for Heijmans Excelsior in the Dutch club championship.

She won the European blitz title in Netanya in 2018 and both the rapid and blitz titles there in 2019, and the European rapid title in Chianciano Terme in 2021. In 2021 she took bronze at the World Championship in Tallinn, and in 2022 she won the World blitz championship in Riga and a bronze medal at the European Championship in Kortrijk, Belgium, where she finished level on points with the Polish players Natalia Sadowska and Marta Bankowska and placed third on tiebreaks.

=== 2023–2026 ===
On 1 April 2023 she topped both FMJD women's rating lists: classical (for the first time since October 2017) and blitz (which she had led continuously since January 2020). In autumn 2023 she won the World Championship in Willemstad, scoring 8 wins and 7 draws in 15 games.

In June 2024 she won the European Championship in Chianciano Terme with 14 points from 9 games. In December 2024 she played a world title match in Wageningen against Darya Tkachenko, who represented the Netherlands. The 12 regular games ended level (one win each and ten draws), and Motrichko lost the title after a mistake with the white pieces in the second tiebreak game.

In 2025 she regained the world title at the championship in Couva, Trinidad and Tobago.

In 2026 she won silver medals in the classical and blitz events and gold in rapid with the Ukrainian team at the Women's World Team Championships in Saint-Doulchard, France. In July she won the World blitz championship in Riga with 17 points out of 22, and in October she won silver in the classical event, gold in rapid and bronze in blitz at the European championships in Beilen, Netherlands.

== Results (2018–2026) ==
Results in tournaments in International draughts according to the World Draughts Federation (FMJD). For team events, the rounds and points columns show Motrichko's individual games and points, and the place columns show the team's place.

2018	City	Dates	Rounds	Points	Women's place	Overall place
World Cup Abidjan *****	Abidjan	23–29.04	7	7	9	
World Championship (rapid)	Bergamo	30.05	9	13	2	
World Championship (blitz)	Bergamo	31.05–01.06	19	26	3	
World Cup Hungary Open *	Budapest	3–9.06	9	11	2	12
World Cup Open Flevoland ***	Ens (Emmeloord)	18–24.06	9	11	1	23
World Cup Polish Open ***	Szczyrk	19–25.08	9	10	4	21
European Championship (blitz)	Netanya	20.10	9	13	1	
European Championship (rapid)	Netanya	21.10	9	10	10	
World Cup 6th Xingqiu Cup *****	Lishui	05–11.11	9	10	15	32
Ukrainian Championship	Kherson	22–29.11	9	16	1	
Ukrainian Championship (rapid)	Kherson	30.11–01.12	9	14	1	
Ukrainian Championship (blitz)	Kherson	02.12	9	12	4	
European Championship	Moscow	16–22.12	9	11	6	
World Cup 2018, final standings					2	
2019	City	Dates	Rounds	Points	Women's place	Overall place
World Cup Turkish Open ***	Antalya	07–14.03	9	8	10	28
IMSA World Masters Championship (rapid)	Hengshui	14–16.05	7	9	2	
IMSA World Masters Championship (blitz)	Hengshui	17–18.05	17	20	6	
World Championship	Yakutsk	11–23.06	15	14	11	
World Cup Rotterdam Open ***	Rotterdam	14–20.07	9	13	1	2
World Cup Riga Open *****	Riga	22–28.07	9	11	6	
World Championship (blitz)	Riga	29.07	11	16	3	
World Cup 7th Xingqiu Cup *****	Lishui	17–22.08	9	12	2	15
European Team Championship	Chianciano Terme	02–07.09	5	7	2	
European Team Championship (rapid)	Chianciano Terme	04.09	5	8	1	
European Team Championship (blitz)	Chianciano Terme	07.09	5	4	4	
World Championship (rapid)	Beilen	20.10	7	8	14	
World Cup COC2019 ***	Willemstad	11–17.11	9	10	4	18
European Championship (rapid)	Netanya	29.11	9	14	1	
European Championship (blitz)	Netanya	30.11	9	15	1	
Ukrainian Championship (rapid)	Kherson	13–14.12	9	22	1	
Ukrainian Championship (blitz)	Kherson	15.12	9	23	1	
Ukrainian Championship	Kherson	16–23.12	8	11	2	
World Cup 2019, final standings					3	
2020	City	Dates	Rounds	Points	Women's place	Overall place
World Cup Turkish Open ***	Antalya	07–14.03	9	10	1	7
World Cup 2020, final standings					2	
2021	City	Dates	Rounds	Points	Women's place	Overall place
World Championship 2021	Tallinn	28.06–14.07	15	22	3	
European Team Championship (rapid) 2021	Chianciano Terme	08.10	8	11	2	
European Championship (rapid) 2021	Chianciano Terme	10.10	9	14	1	
European Championship (blitz) 2021	Chianciano Terme	11.10	9	11	6	
World Championship (rapid) 2021	Julinek	18.12	9	12	4	
World Championship (blitz) 2021	Julinek	19.12	9	10	11	
2022	City	Dates	Rounds	Points	Women's place	Overall place
World Championship teams women classic	Antalya	01–06.05	6	8	2	2
World Championship teams women rapid	Antalya	07.05	8	7	5	4
World Championship teams women blitz	Antalya	08.05	8	11	1	1
World Cup Riga Open	Riga	03–09.07	9	12	4	
Women's World Championship Blitz	Riga	10.07	19	11	1	
European Championship women classic	Kortrijk	03–09.10	9	12	3	3
World Cup Damweek Hijken 2022	Beilen	16–21.10	9	10	2	18
European Championship Rapid, women's category 2022	Beilen	22.10	8	11	3	
European Championship Blitz, women's category 2022	Beilen	23.10	9	15	2	
World Cup Polish Open ***	Julinek	12–17.12	9	10	2	18
World Championship Rapid 2022	Julinek	18.12	7	10	2	
World Cup 2021–2022, final standings					3	
2023	City	Dates	Rounds	Points	Women's place	Overall place
XXVI Cup City of Verona – Memorial "Enrico Molesini"	Verona	18–19.03	6	11	1	1
Drancy Open World Cup ***	Paris	29.04–06.05	9	11	1	11
Salou Open 2023	Salou	21–29.05	9	12	1	6
European Team Championship Classic	Follonica	12–16.06	6	10	2	
European Team Championship Blitz	Follonica	17.06	5	7	1	
European Team Championship Rapid	Follonica	18.06	5	9	1	
Riga Open World Cup ***	Riga	02–08.07	9	13	1	
World Championship Women 2023	Willemstad	28.09–13.10	15	23	1	
16th World Championship Women Blitz	Lishui	14.11	9	12	4	
2023 FMJD World Cup Tournament & 8th "Xingqiu Cup" Draughts China Open	Lishui	11–17.11	9	11	3	10
12th FMJD World Women Rapid Championship 2023	Julinek	10.12	7	9	4	
World Cup 2022–2023, final standings					2	
2024	City	Dates	Rounds	Points	Women's place	Overall place
Memorial Otello Marini	Tolmezzo	24.02.2024	6	11	1	1
FMJD World Cup *** Flevoland Open 2024	Kraggenburg	20–27.04.2024	9	11	1	8
Women's Team World Championships	Albufeira	01–06.05.2024	5	5	5	
Women's Team World Championships Rapid	Albufeira	07.05.2024	5	6	2	
Women's Team World Championships Blitz	Albufeira	08.05.2024	10	14	2	
European Championship	Chianciano Terme	02–07.06.2024	9	14	1	
European Championship Rapid	Chianciano Terme	08.06.2024	9	11	4	
European Championship Blitz	Chianciano Terme	09.06.2024	9	10	8	
World Cup Riga Open 2024	Riga	30.06–06.07.2024	9	12	1	9
World Cup Xintai 2024	Xintai	13–18.08.2024	9	13	2	7
US Open 2024 – Kolman Turiy Memorial	Huntington, NY	06–13.09.2024	9	14	1	1
World Title Match Motrichko–Tkachenko	Wageningen	17–31.12.2024	12	12	2	2 (after tiebreak)
World Cup 2023–2024, final standings					2	
2025	City	Dates	Rounds	Points	Women's place	Overall place
28th Cup City of Verona	Verona	08–09.03.2025	6	7	1	19
European Championship Women Rapid	Brussels	10.05.2025	9	12	3	
European Championship Women Blitz	Brussels	11.05.2025	9	12	3	
Salou Open 2025	Salou	25.05–02.06.2025	9	13	1	3
Salou Open Blitz 2025	Salou	30.05.2025	7	10	1	7
FMJD World Cup *** Riga Open 2025	Riga	06–12.07.2025	9	12	2	12
Nijmegen Open	Nijmegen	20–26.07.2025	10	11	5	43
Women's World Championship Blitz	Hoogeveen	17.08.2025	9	14	2 (preliminary)	3 (final)
Women's World Championship Superblitz	Hoogeveen	18.08.2025	8	13	1 (preliminary)	3 (final)
World Championship Women 2025	Couva	27.09–05.10.2025	9	12	1	
2025 FMJD World Cup 10th "Xingqiu Cup" China Open	Lishui	09–16.11.2025	9	11	3	17
15th World Championship Rapid 2025 – Women	Lishui	12.11.2025	7	10	4	
World Cup 2024–2025, final standings					3	
2026	City	Dates	Rounds	Points	Women's place	Overall place
World Team Championships Women	Saint-Doulchard	05–10.05.2026	7	8	2	
World Team Championships Women Rapid	Saint-Doulchard	11.05.2026	10	16	1	
World Team Championships Women Blitz	Saint-Doulchard	12.05.2026	9	14	2	
Salou Open 2026	Salou	24.05–01.06.2026	9	10	3	35
FMJD World Cup *** Riga Open 2026	Riga	05–10.07.2026	9	12	2	15
World Championship Women Blitz 2026	Riga	08.07.2026	11	17	1	
Tobago Open World Cup 2026	Tobago	09–18.09.2026	9	11	1	12
32nd Juozas Kulikauskas International Draughts Memorial	Vilnius	25–27.09.2026	7	7	3	20
13th European Championship Women	Beilen	10–16.10.2026	9	12	2	
European Championship Women Rapid	Beilen	17.10.2026	9	13	1	
European Championship Women Blitz	Beilen	18.10.2026	9	13	3	

== Coaches ==
Throughout her career Motrichko has been coached by Heorhiy Podstavkin, an Honoured Coach of Ukraine. In her youth she was also advised by Anatoliy Gaptarenko and Serhiy Boyko (draughts-64) and Igor Kirzner (draughts-100). Since 2016 she has worked with the multiple world champion Anatoli Gantvarg.

== Personal life ==
Since 2014 Motrichko has been married to the Belarusian draughts player Vladislav Splender, a Master of Sport of Belarus. They have two children, a daughter born in 2015 and a son born in 2022.
