= 2019 Women's World Draughts Championship =

Draughts tournament

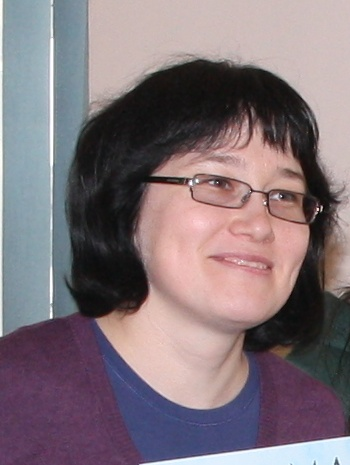
- 2019 Women's World Draughts Champion Tamara Tansykkuzina

Tournament information
- Location: Yakutsk, Russia
- Dates: 11 June–23 June
- Administrator: FMJD
- Tournament format: Round-robin tournament

Final positions
- Champion: Tamara Tansykkuzhina
- Runner-up: Aygul Idrisova

The 2019 Women's World Draughts Championship in international draughts was held from 11–23 June 2019 in Yakutsk, Russia under the auspices of the International Draughts Federation (FMJD). Sixteen female players competed in the tournament, which was played as a round-robin.

== Participants ==
Number	Title	Name	Country	Qualification Path
1	GMIF	Natalia Sadowska	Poland	World Champion 2018
2	GMIF	Olga Fedorovich	Belarus	2 place in Women's World Championship 2017
3	CMFF	Biagne Elsa Negbre	Ivory Coast	Africa
4	MFF	Annelaine Jacobs	Aruba	America 2
5	GMIF	You Zhang	China	Asia 1
6	GMIF	Hanqing Zhao	China	Asia 2
7	GMIF	Enkhbold Khuslen	Mongolia	Asia 3
8	GMIF	Matrena Nogovitsyna	Russia	Europe 1
9	MIF	Natalia Shestakova	Russia	Europe 2
10	GMIF	Darja Fedorovich	Belarus	Europe
11	GMIF	Viktoriya Motrichko	Ukraine	Europe
12	MIF	Heike Verheul	Netherlands	Europe
13	MFF	Palina Petrusiova	Belarus	Europe
14	GMIF	Aygul Idrisova	Russia	Global Reserve List 1
15	GMIF	Tamara Tansykkuzhina	Russia	Sponsor place
16	GMIF	Ksenia Nakhova	Russia	Organiser place

GMIF — women's international grandmaster

MIF — women's international master

MFF — women's master FMJD

== Rules ==
The games were played with the official FMJD classical time control: 80 minutes plus a 1-minute increment per move. FMJD regulations prohibited players from agreeing to a draw before each had completed 40 moves; doing so required the referee to award both players 0 points.

The final rankings were determined by total points. If two or more players finished with the same score, the following tiebreaks were applied:

1. Number of wins.
2. Results in the direct encounters between the tied players.
3. Results obtained against opponents in order of their final ranking.

For places 1–3, tiebreaks using the Lehmann–Georgiev system (15 minutes plus a 2-second increment per move for an unlimited number of games) were played if necessary; other places were shared.

== Schedule ==
Round	Date	Time
1	11 June	15:00
2	12 June	14:00
3	13 June	10:00
4	13 June	16:00
5	14 June	10:00
6	15 June	14:00
7	16 June	10:00
8	16 June	16:00
9	17 June	14:00
10	18 June	10:00
11	18 June	16:00
12	19 June	10:00
13	21 June	14:00
14	22 June	14:00
15	23 June	10:00

== Crosstable ==
Place	Name	Country	Title	Rating	1	2	3	4	5	6	7	8	9	10	11	12	13	14	15	16	Points	Wins	Draws	Losses
1	Tamara Tansykkuzhina	Russia	GMIF	2203	*	1	1	1	0	1	1	1	1	1	2	2	2	2	2	2	20	6	8	1
2	Aygul Idrisova	Russia	GMIF	2159	1	*	1	2	1	1	1	1	1	2	1	1	1	2	2	2	20	5	10	0
3	Darja Fedorovich	Belarus	MIF	2189	1	1	*	1	1	1	1	1	1	2	1	1	2	2	2	2	20	5	10	0
4	Matrena Nogovitsyna	Russia	GMIF	2252	1	0	1	*	1	2	1	2	1	1	2	0	1	2	+2	2	19	6	7	2
5	Natalia Sadowska	Poland	GMIF	2244	2	1	1	1	*	1	1	1	1	1	1	1	1	2	2	2	19	4	11	0
6	Olga Fedorovich	Belarus	GMIF	2252	1	1	1	0	1	*	1	1	0	1	2	1	2	2	2	2	18	5	8	2
7	Hanqing Zhao	China	GMIF	2145	1	1	1	1	1	1	*	1	1	0	2	1	1	2	+2	2	18	4	10	1
8	Ksenia Nakhova	Russia	GMIF	2096	1	1	1	0	1	1	1	*	1	1	1	2	2	1	2	2	18	4	10	1
9	You Zhang	China	GMIF	2122	1	1	1	1	1	2	1	1	*	1	1	1	1	1	2	2	18	3	12	0
10	Palina Petrusiova	Belarus	MFF	2114	1	0	0	1	1	1	2	1	1	*	1	2	1	1	2	2	17	4	9	2
11	Viktoriya Motrichko	Ukraine	GMIF	2206	0	1	1	0	1	0	0	1	1	1	*	2	1	1	2	2	14	3	8	4
12	Natalia Shestakova	Russia	GMIF	2141	0	1	1	2	1	1	1	0	1	0	0	*	1	0	2	2	13	3	7	5
13	Heike Verheul	Netherlands	MIF	2186	0	1	0	1	1	0	1	0	1	1	1	1	*	1	1	2	12	1	10	4
14	Enkhbold Khuslen	Mongolia	MFF	2014	0	0	0	0	0	0	0	1	1	0	1	2	1	*	1	2	10	2	6	7
15	Biagne Elsa Negbre	Ivory Coast	CMFF	0	0	0	0	–	0	0	–	0	0	0	0	0	1	1	*	2	4	1	2	12
16	Annelaine Jacobs	Aruba	MFF	0	0	0	0	0	0	0	0	0	0	0	0	0	0	0	0	*	0	0	0	15

== Results by round ==
Round 1

- Natalia Shestakova – Ksenia Nakhova 0–2
- Tamara Tansykkuzhina – Heike Verheul 2–0
- Aygul Idrisova – Viktoriya Motrichko 1–1
- Matrena Nogovitsyna – You Zhang 1–1
- Hanqing Zhao – Enkhbold Khuslen 2–0
- Annelaine Jacobs – Elsa Negbre 0–2
- Natalia Sadowska – Palina Petrusiova 1–1
- Olga Fedorovich – Darja Fedorovich 1–1

Round 2

- Ksenia Nakhova – Darja Fedorovich 1–1
- Palina Petrusiova – Olga Fedorovich 1–1
- Elsa Negbre – Natalia Sadowska 0–2
- Enkhbold Khuslen – Annelaine Jacobs 2–0
- You Zhang – Hanqing Zhao 1–1
- Viktoriya Motrichko – Matrena Nogovitsyna 0–2
- Heike Verheul – Aygul Idrisova1–1
- Natalia Shestakova – Tamara Tansykkuzhina 0–2

Round 3

- Tamara Tansykkuzhina– Ksenia Nakhova 1–1
- Natalia Shestakova – Aygul Idrisova 1–1
- Matrena Nogovitsyna – Heike Verheul 1–1
- Hanqing Zhao – Viktoriya Motrichko 2–0
- Annelaine Jacobs – You Zhang 0–2
- Natalia Sadowska – Enkhbold Khuslen 2–0
- Olga Fedorovich – Elsa Negbre 2–0
- Darja Fedorovich – Palina Petrusiova 2–0

Round 4

- Ksenia Nakhova – Palina Petrusiova 1–1
- Elsa Negbre – Darja Fedorovich 0–2
- Enkhbold Khuslen – Olga Fedorovich 0–2
- You Zhang – Natalia Sadowska 1–1
- Viktoriya Motrichko – Annelaine Jacobs 2–0
- Heike Verheul – Hanqing Zhao 1–1
- Natalia Shestakova – Matrena Nogovitsyna 2–0
- Tamara Tansykkuzhina– Aygul Idrisova 1–1

Round 5

- Aygul Idrisova – Ksenia Nakhova 1–1
- Matrena Nogovitsyna – Tamara Tansykkuzhina 1–1
- Hanqing Zhao – Natalia Shestakova 1–1
- Annelaine Jacobs – Heike Verheul 0–2
- Natalia Sadowska – Viktoriya Motrichko 1–1
- Olga Fedorovich – You Zhang 0–2
- Darja Fedorovich – Enkhbold Khuslen 2–0
- Palina Petrusiova – Elsa Negbre 2–0

Round 6

- Ksenia Nakhova – Elsa Negbre 2–0
- Enkhbold Khuslen – Palina Petrusiova 1–1
- You Zhang – Darja Fedorovich 1–1
- Viktoriya Motrichko – Olga Fedorovich 0–2
- Heike Verheul – Natalia Sadowska 1–1
- Natalia Shestakova – Annelaine Jacobs 2–0
- Tamara Tansykkuzhina – Hanqing Zhao 1–1
- Aygul Idrisova – Matrena Nogovitsyna 2–0

Round 7

- Matrena Nogovitsyna – Ksenia Nakhova 2–0
- Hanqing Zhao – Aygul Idrisova 1–1
- Annelaine Jacobs – Tamara Tansykkuzhina 0–2
- Natalia Sadowska – Natalia Shestakova 1–1
- Olga Fedorovich – Heike Verheul 2–0
- Darja Fedorovich – Viktoriya Motrichko 1–1
- Palina Petrusiova – You Zhang 1–1
- Elsa Negbre – Enkhbold Khuslen 1–1

Round 8

- Ksenia Nakhova – Enkhbold Khuslen 1–1
- You Zhang – Elsa Negbre 2–0
- Viktoriya Motrichko – Palina Petrusiova 1–1
- Heike Verheul – Darja Fedorovich 0–2
- Natalia Shestakova – Olga Fedorovich 1–1
- Tamara Tansykkuzhina – Natalia Sadowska 0–2
- Aygul Idrisova – Annelaine Jacobs 2–0
- Matrena Nogovitsyna – Hanqing Zhao 1–1

Round 9

- Hanqing Zhao – Ksenia Nakhova 1–1
- Annelaine Jacobs – Matrena Nogovitsyna 0–2
- Natalia Sadowska – Aygul Idrisova 1–1
- Olga Fedorovich – Tamara Tansykkuzhina 1–1
- Darja Fedorovich – Natalia Shestakova 1–1
- Palina Petrusiova – Heike Verheul 1–1
- Elsa Negbre – Viktoriya Motrichko 0–2
- Enkhbold Khuslen – You Zhang 1–1

Round 10

- Ksenia Nakhova – You Zhang 1–1
- Viktoriya Motrichko – Enkhbold Khuslen 1–1
- Heike Verheul – Elsa Negbre 1–1
- Natalia Shestakova – Palina Petrusiova 0–2
- Tamara Tansykkuzhina – Darja Fedorovich 1–1
- Aygul Idrisova – Olga Fedorovich 1–1
- Matrena Nogovitsyna – Natalia Sadowska 1–1
- Hanqing Zhao – Annelaine Jacobs 2–0

Round 11

- Annelaine Jacobs – Ksenia Nakhova 0–2
- Natalia Sadowska – Hanqing Zhao 1–1
- Olga Fedorovich – Matrena Nogovitsyna 0–2
- Darja Fedorovich – Aygul Idrisova 1–1
- Palina Petrusiova – Tamara Tansykkuzhina 1–1
- Elsa Negbre – Natalia Shestakova 0–2
- Enkhbold Khuslen – Heike Verheul 1–1
- You Zhang – Viktoriya Motrichko 1–1

Round 12

- Ksenia Nakhova – Viktoriya Motrichko 1–1
- Heike Verheul – You Zhang 1–1
- Natalia Shestakova – Enkhbold Khuslen 0–2
- Tamara Tansykkuzhina – Elsa Negbre 2–0
- Aygul Idrisova – Palina Petrusiova 2–0
- Matrena Nogovitsyna – Darja Fedorovich 1–1
- Hanqing Zhao – Olga Fedorovich 1–1
- Annelaine Jacobs – Natalia Sadowska 0–2

Round 13

- Natalia Sadowska – Ksenia Nakhova 1–1
- Olga Fedorovich – Annelaine Jacobs 2–0
- Darja Fedorovich – Hanqing Zhao 1–1
- Palina Petrusiova – Matrena Nogovitsyna 1–1
- Elsa Negbre – Aygul Idrisova 0–2
- Enkhbold Khuslen – Tamara Tansykkuzhina 0–2
- You Zhang – Natalia Shestakova 1–1
- Viktoriya Motrichko – Heike Verheul 1–1

Round 14

- Ksenia Nakhova – Heike Verheul 2–0
- Natalia Shestakova – Viktoriya Motrichko 0–2
- Tamara Tansykkuzhina – You Zhang 1–1
- Aygul Idrisova – Enkhbold Khuslen 2–0
- Matrena Nogovitsyna – Elsa Negbre +/–
- Hanqing Zhao – Palina Petrusiova 0–2
- Annelaine Jacobs – Darja Fedorovich 0–2
- Natalia Sadowska – Olga Fedorovich 1–1

Round 15

- Olga Fedorovich – Ksenia Nakhova 1–1
- Darja Fedorovich – Natalia Sadowska 1–1
- Palina Petrusiova – Annelaine Jacobs 2–0
- Elsa Negbre – Hanqing Zhao –/+
- Enkhbold Khuslen – Matrena Nogovitsyna 0–2
- You Zhang – Aygul Idrisova 1–1
- Viktoriya Motrichko – Tamara Tansykkuzhina 0–2
- Heike Verheul – Natalia Shestakova 1–1
