= Olga Levina =

Olga Levina may refer to:

- Olga Levina (draughts player), Soviet, then Ukrainian, international draughts player
- Olga Levina (handballer), Russian handball player
