= Agata Parahina =

Russian international draughts player (born 1999)

Personal information
- Nationality: Russian
- Born: 9 August 1999 (age 26) Ishimbay, Republic of Bashkortostan, Russia
- Education: Bashkir Medical University

Sport
- Country: Russia
- Sport: draughts
- Event: blitz

Agata Parahina (born 9 August 1999, Ishimbay, Russia) is a Russian international draughts player and a current world champion in the women's biltz event. She emerged as the winner of the blitz category during the 2019 Women's World Draughts Championship. Agata also became the third draughts player from the Republic of Bashkortostan to win a world championship title.
