= Elena Mikhailovskaya =

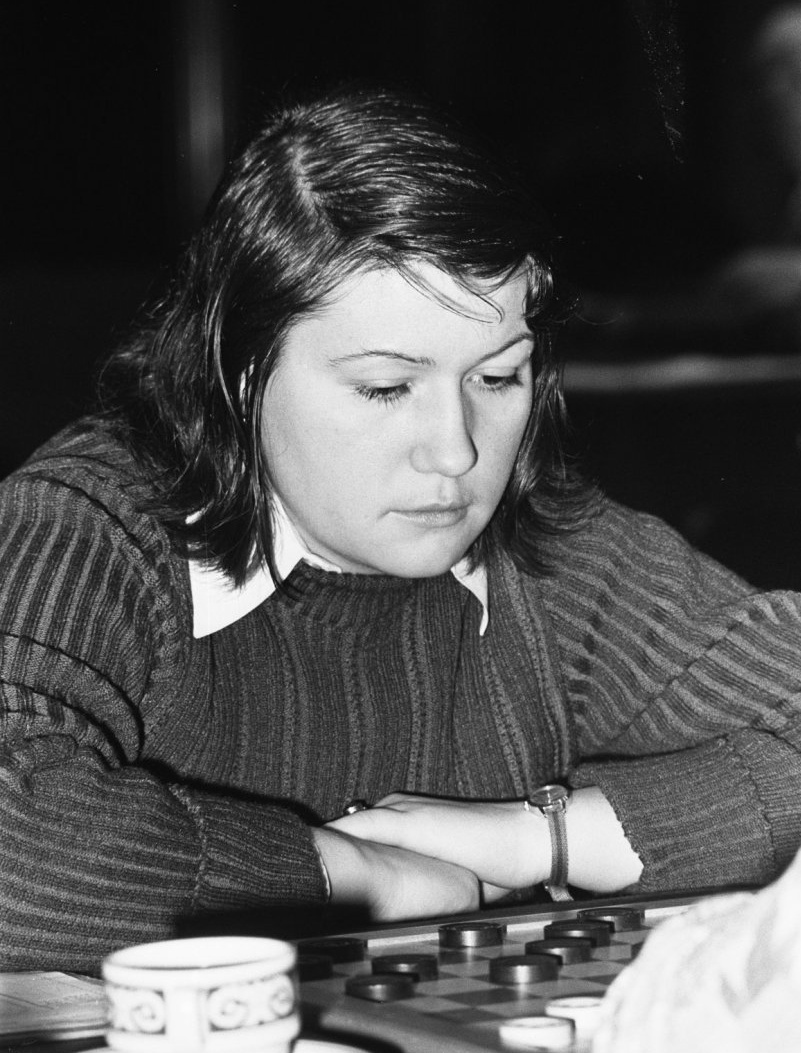
- Elena Mikhailovskaya in 1974

Personal information
- Full name: Elena Konstantinovna Mikhailovskaya
- Nationality: Soviet Union / Russia
- Born: November 21, 1949 Moscow, Soviet Union
- Died: February 4, 1995 (aged 45) Moscow, Russia

Sport
- Sport: draughts
- Club: Lokomotiv Moscow

Achievements and titles
- World finals: World Championships: Gold (1973–1977)

Elena Konstantinovna Mikhailovskaya (Russian: Елена Константиновна Михайловская; November 21, 1949, Moscow, USSR – February 4, 1995, Moscow, Russia) was the first female World champion in international draughts. She won this title five times in a row (1973–1977). Before that she was four-time champion of the Soviet Union in Russian checkers (1969–1972). Later she was coaching and heading the Moscow draughts federation.

== Biography ==
As a child, Elena Mikhailovskaya was enjoying active sports, but at the age of 15 health issues forced her to settle down. She intended to start playing chess seriously but ended up in a draughts club. In about a year she won a personal-team youth championship of the Soviet Union with the Moscow team, and in 1968 she won the individual championship as well. Starting from 1969 she was playing for the Moscow club Lokomotiv Moscow, and the same year she won the senior title of the Soviet Union champion in Russian checkers, defeating in the last game of the tournament the previous holder of the title, Iraida Spasskaya, and then winning the gold medal barrage against Janina Augustinaite. She then went to hold the title for three more years in a row, establishing the all-time Soviet record.

In the early 1970s, Mikhailovskaya switched to international draughts. In 1973, she won a prestigious international tournament in Amsterdam which was retroactively considered to be first unofficial world female championship. In the next four years, she won four official World champion titles. Among these, her 1975 victory was considered the most special, since Mikhailovskaya has finished it with a nearly perfect score, drawing only the last game against Lenie Toonen-Geurts after winning eight in a row. Only in 1979 did she concede the world crown to Ludmilla Meijler-Sochnenko.

When Elena Mikhailovskaya retired from active play, she continued coaching. She also was the president of Moscow draughts federation until the day of her death. She died in February 1995 in Moscow and was buried at the Vagankovo Cemetery. Ten years later, the Moscow Draughts Federation decided to proclaim 2005 the Year of Elena Mikhailovskaya.

== Record and statistics in the World female championships in international draughts ==
Year	Venue	Result	Place
1973 (Note: Unofficial world championship)	Amsterdam, Netherlands	8+1=1-	1
1974	Amsterdam	6+4=0-	1
1975	Amsterdam	8+1=0-	1
1976	Amsterdam	7+3=0-	1
1977	Amsterdam	5+5=0-	1
1979	Sneek, Netherlands	6+3=2-	3 (Note: Shared 3–4 place with Petra Polman)
1980	De Lier, Netherlands	6+4=1-	3

== External sources ==
- Profile at the Dutch Draughts Union tournament database
