= Hanqing Zhao =

Chinese draughts player (born 1994)

Personal information
- Born: April 24, 1994 (age 32) Wuhan, China

Sport
- Country: China
- Sport: Draughts
- Rank: Candidate Master (2018); Woman Grandmaster (2018)

Achievements and titles
- Personal best: 2153 (July 2019, rating)

Hanqing Zhao (24 April 1994; Wuhan, China) is a Chinese international draughts player who ranked second at the 2012 Asian Women's Draughts Championship. She became World Draughts Champion Juniors Girls 2012. She was the champion of China many times. Zhao is an International master (MIF). At 7 years-of-age she begin playing in checkmate. After that she started playing draughts.

== World Championship ==
- 2013 (12 place)
- 2015 (7 place)
- 2019 (7 place)
