= Merilii Jalg =

Estonian draughts player

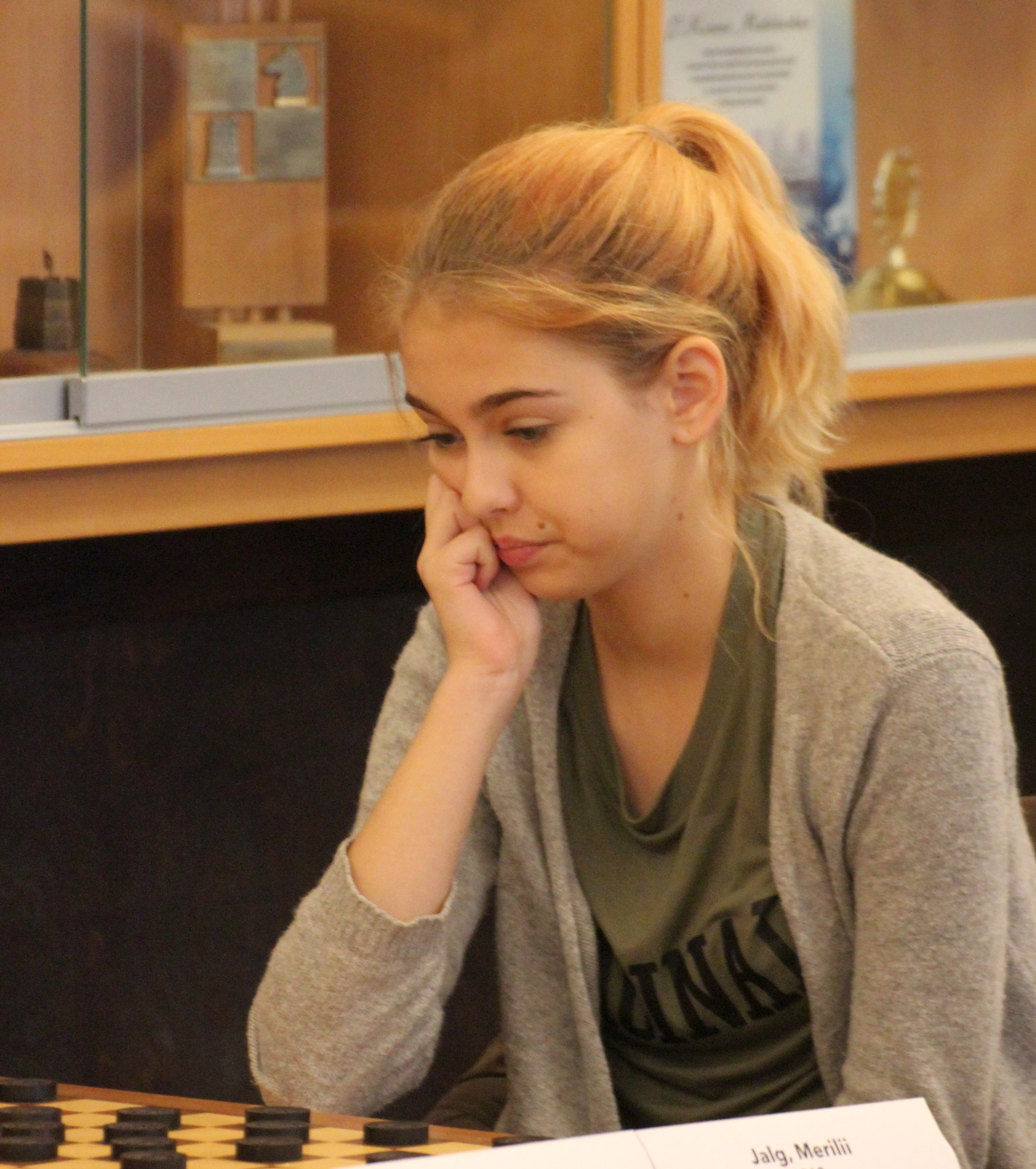
Merilii Jalg (2017)

Merilii Jalg (born September 20, 2001) is an Estonian draughts player, gold medalist of the Estonian women's championship in International and in Russian draughts (both 2018). The elder sister of the shashlist, Triinu Jalg (born 2005).

== Sports biography ==
At the adult level, she has been competing since the year 2015. She is trained by Arno Uutma.

2015

- 7th place at the Estonian Women's Championship in International draughts

2016

- 4th place at the Estonian Women's Championship in International draughts
- 4th place in the Estonian Women's Championship in Russian draughts

2017

- 2nd place in the Estonian Championship among women in Russian draughts
- 15th place at the Women's World Draughts Championship

2018

- Estonian champion among women in Russian draughts
- Estonian champion among women in International draughts
- 27th place at the Women's World Draughts Championship (Rapid)
