= You Zhang =

Chinese draughts player (born 2000)

Personal information
- Born: March 2, 2000 (age 26)

Sport
- Country: China
- Sport: Draughts
- Rank: FMJD Master (2024); Woman Grandmaster (2015)

Achievements and titles
- Highest world ranking: No. 202 (January 2024)
- Personal best: 2207 (January 2024, rating)

You Zhang (born 2 March 2000) is a Chinese draughts player (International draughts), who ranked first at the 2015 Asian Women's Draughts Championship. She took place in 2012 World Mind Sports Games (31 place), in 2015 Women's World Draughts Championship (13 place), in 2019 Women's World Draughts Championship (9 place). You Zhang is a Women's International grandmaster (GMIF).

== Sources ==
- Profile, FMJD
- Profile KNDB
