= Ludmilla Meijler-Sochnenko =

Belarusian draughts player

Ludmilla Meijler-Sochnenko (born in Minsk, Belarus) is a Belarusian female draughts player. She was the women's world champion in 1979.

== Career ==
Meijler-Sochnenko started playing at age 14, later than most professional players. Nine years later, in 1979, she became the women's world champion. She participated in the world championships in 1980 and 1981, where she twice finished second and again in 1987, coming third. She won the draughts women's championship of the Soviet Union in 1979 and finished second in the same tournament in 1977 and 1982. she was a fanatic competitor, and trained 5-6 hours every day. Her trainer Michael Kats had a large influence on women's Draughts, and his disciples included world champions Ludmilla Sochnenko, Zoja Golubeva and Elena Altsjoel.

In 1985 she competed for the last time at the women's Soviet Union draughts championship, coming 14th of 16 competitors. She began studying psychiatry, which interrupted her training. During five years she did not play at all.

She married a Dutchman and since 1990 lives in the Netherlands. In the Netherlands she could not compete without reasonable fluency in Dutch language, preventing her from competing. She participated a couple of times (1991, 1992 and 1994) in the Dutch draughts women's championships. Her best performance there was third in 1992.

== Music ==
She published some albums of instrumental music, such as Семейный альбом / Familie album and Грезы / Dagdromen (Daydreaming).
