= 2021 Women's World Draughts Championship =

Draughts tournament

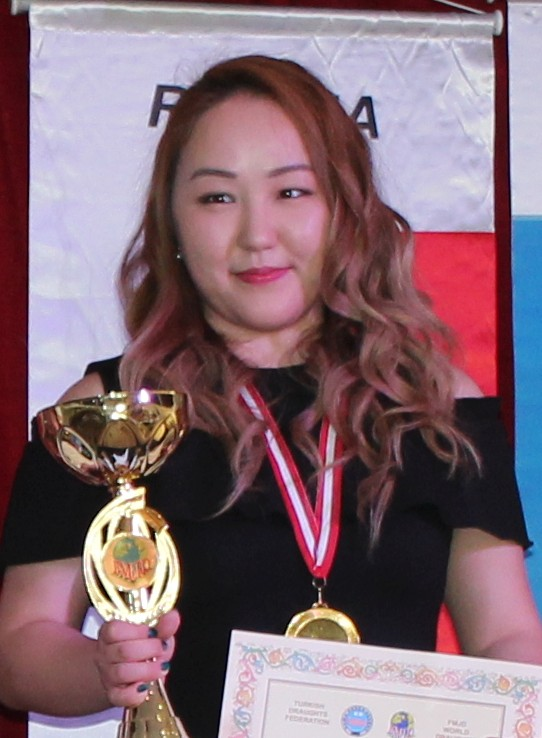
- 2021 Women's World Draughts Champion Matrena Nogovitsyna

Tournament information
- Location: Tallinn, Estonia
- Dates: 28 June–14 July
- Administrator: FMJD
- Tournament format: Round-robin tournament
- Venue: Hotel Viru

Final positions
- Champion: Matrena Nogovitsyna
- Runner-up: Tamara Tansykkuzhina

The 2021 Women's World Draughts Championship in international draughts was held from 28 June to 14 July, 2021, at the Hotel Viru in Tallinn, Estonia. It was held under the auspices of the International Draughts Federation (FMJD). 16 players from 9 countries competed in the tournament, which was played in a COVID bubble. The Championship was played as a round-robin tournament. The main referee was IR Frank Teer. The total prize money for the tournament was 20,000 euros.

The 2021 World Draughts Championship took place simultaneously at the same hotel.

Matrena Nogovitsyna from Russia won her first title.

== Rules and regulations ==
The games were played with the official FMJD classical time control: 80 minutes plus a 1-minute increment per move. FMJD regulations prohibited players from agreeing to a draw before each had completed 40 moves; doing so required the referee to award both players 0 points.

The final rankings were determined by total points. If two or more players finished with the same score, the following tiebreaks were applied:

1. Number of wins.
2. Results in the direct encounters between the tied players.
3. Results obtained against opponents in order of their final ranking.

For places 1–3, tiebreaks using the Lehmann–Georgiev system (15 minutes plus a 2-second increment per move for an unlimited number of games) were played if necessary; other places were shared.

== Schedule ==
Round	Date	Time
1	28 June	15:00
2	29 June	15:00
3	30 June	15:00
4	1 July	15:00
5	2 July	15:00
6	4 July	15:00
7	5 July	13:30
8	6 July	13:30
9	7 July	13:30
10	8 July	13:30
11	9 July	13:30
12	11 July	13:30
13	12 July	13:30
14	13 July	13:30
15	14 July	9:30

== Participants ==
Number	Title	Name	Country	Qualification Path
1	GMIF	Tamara Tansykkuzhina	Russia	World Champion
2	GMIF	Natalia Sadowska	Poland	2nd place in the title match
3	GMIF	Aygul Idrisova	Russia	2nd place in Women's World Championship 2019
4		Karmen Kuusik	Estonia	Organiser place
5		Triinu Jalg	Estonia	Sponsor place
6		Ganame Adjaratou Pendewende	Burkina Faso	Africa
7	MIF	Lublyana Turiy	United States	America
8	GMIF	Munkhbaatar Nyamjargal	Mongolia	Asia
9	GMIF	Bayar Misheel	Mongolia	Asia
10	GMIF	Matrena Nogovitsyna	Russia	Europe
11	GMIF	Olga Fedorovich	Belarus	Europe
12	GMIF	Viktoriya Motrichko	Ukraine	Europe
13	MIF	Darja Fedorovich	Belarus	Europe
14	GMIF	Darya Tkachenko	Russia	Europe
15	MIF	Elena Chesnokova	Latvia	Europe
16	MFF	Arleta Flisikovska	Poland	Global reserve list

GMIF — women's international grandmaster

MIF — women's international master

MFF — women's master FMJD

== Results ==
Place	Name	Country	Title	Rating	1	2	3	4	5	6	7	8	9	10	11	12	13	14	15	16	Points	Wins	Draws	Losses
1.	Matrena Nogovitsyna	Russia	GMIF	2213	*	1	1	1	1	2	1	2	1	2	2	2	2	2	2	2	24	9	6	0
2.	Tamara Tansykkuzhina	Russia	GMIF	2263	1	*	1	0	1	2	1	2	1	1	2	2	2	2	2	2	22	8	6	1
3.	Viktoriya Motrichko	Ukraine	GMIF	2219	1	1	*	1	2	1	2	1	1	1	1	2	2	2	2	2	22	7	8	0
4.	Natalia Sadowska	Poland	GMIF	2248	1	2	1	*	2	1	1	1	1	2	1	2	1	1	2	2	21	6	9	0
5.	Arleta Flisikovska	Poland	MFF	2147	1	1	0	0	*	1	1	1	2	2	1	1	2	2	2	2	19	6	7	2
6.	Olga Fedorovich	Belarus	GMIF	2236	0	0	1	1	1	*	2	1	2	1	1	2	2	2	2	2	19	6	7	2
7.	Elena Chesnokova	Latvia	MIF	2171	1	1	0	1	1	0	*	2	2	0	2	1	1	2	1	2	17	5	7	3
8.	Darja Fedorovich	Belarus	MIF	2194	0	0	1	1	1	1	0	*	1	1	2	1	2	2	2	2	17	5	7	3
9.	Aygul Idrisova	Russia	GMIF	2153	1	1	1	1	0	1	0	1	*	1	1	1	2	2	2	2	17	4	9	2
10.	Darya Tkachenko	Russia	GMIF	2197	0	1	1	0	0	0	2	1	1	*	1	1	2	1	2	2	15	4	7	4
11.	Bayar Misheel	Mongolia	GMIF	2070	0	0	1	1	1	1	0	0	1	1	*	2	0	2	1	2	13	3	7	5
12.	Triinu Jalg	Estonia	CMFF	1969	0	0	0	0	1	1	1	1	1	1	0	*	1	1	1	2	11	1	9	5
13.	Munkhbaatar Nyamjargal	Mongolia	GMIF	2023	0	0	0	1	0	0	1	0	0	0	2	1	*	1	2	2	10	3	4	8
14.	Ganame Adjaratou Pendewende	Burkina Faso	CMFF		0	0	0	1	0	0	0	0	0	1	0	1	1	*	1	2	7	1	5	9
15.	Karmen Kuusik	Estonia	CMFF	1992	0	0	0	0	0	0	1	0	0	0	1	1	0	1	*	2	6	1	4	10
16.	Lublyana Turiy	United States	MIF	1929	0	0	0	0	0	0	0	0	0	0	0	0	0	0	0	*	0	0	0	15
