= Alatenghua =

Chinese draughts player

Alatenghua (Chinese 阿拉腾花, Ala Tenghua, Tenghua Ala; born on 22 January 1993) is a Chinese draughts player (International draughts). She was Women's Asian Champion 2014 Alatenghua is an international female master (MIF).

== World Championship ==
- 2013 (6th place)
- 2015 (12th place)

== Asian Championship ==
- 2014 (1st place)
- 2016 (6th place)
- 2017 (4th place)
- 2018 (14th place)

== Chinese Championship ==
- 2009 (1st place)
- 2011 (1st place)
- 2013 (2nd place)
- 2014 (4th place)
- 2015 (1st place)
- 2016 (3rd place)
- 2017 (3rd place)
- 2018 (2nd place)
- 2019 (3rd place)
