= Zoja Golubeva =

Latvian draughts player (born 1967)

- Зоя Голубева
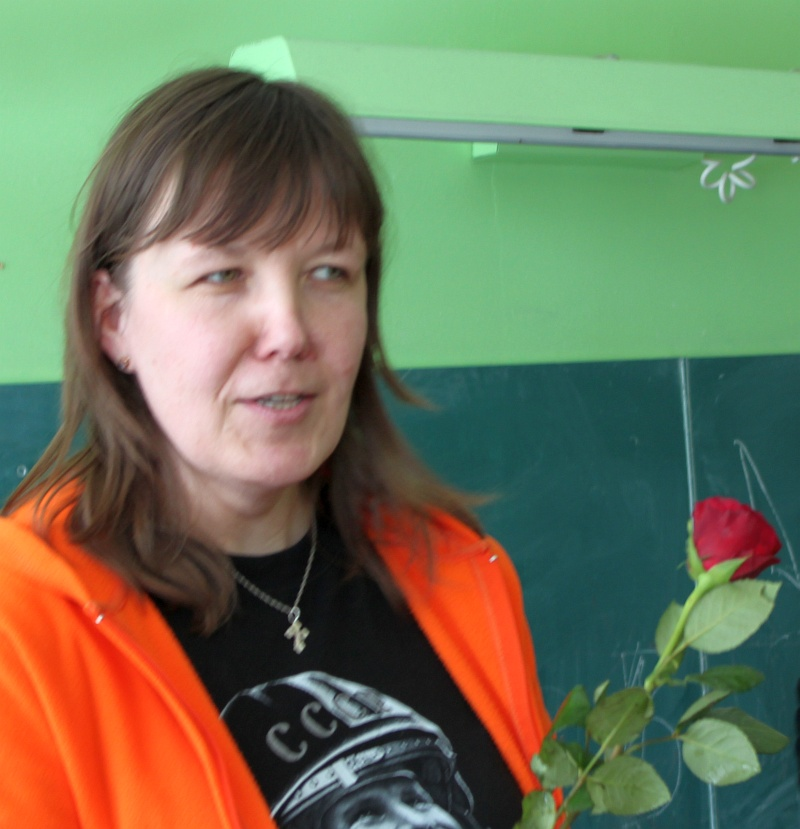
- Born: Zoja Aleksandrovna Sadovskaya; 30 April 1967 (age 58); Minsk, Byelorussian SSR, Soviet Union (now Belarus)

Zoja Aleksandrovna Golubeva (Note: Belarusian: Зоя Аляксандраўна Голубева, romanized: Zoja Aliaksandraǔna Holubieva Russian: Зоя Александровна Го́лубева, romanized: Zoya Aleksandrovna Golubeva) (née Sadovskaya; (Note: Belarusian: Садоўская, romanized: Sadoǔskaja Russian: Садо́вская, romanized: Sadovskaya) born 30 April 1967) is a Soviet, Belarusian and Latvian draughts player in international draughts.

== Career ==
She was Women's World Champion in 1986, 1988, 1990–1992, 1994–2000, 2013, 2015, 2017. She became 16-time champion after winning in 2017; she was also Women's European Champion (2010 and 2012). Zoja Golubeva was also the winner of the International Draughts tournament at the 1st World Mind Sports Games. She is one of the highest ranking women in international draughts.

In 1988, Golubeva married and moved to Latvia. She has a twin, Olga Sadovskaya, who is a Belarusian draughts player.

== Sports achievements ==
=== World Championship ===
Year	Host	Competition	Results
1986	Minsk, Soviet Union	Match with (Soviet Union) Elena Altsjoel	(+3=9-0)
1988	Yalta, Soviet Union	Match with (Soviet Union) Olga Levina	(+3=7-0)
1989	Rosmalen, Netherlands	Tournament	2-3 place (+7=2-2)
1990	Pitsunda, Soviet Union	Match with (Soviet Union) Olga Levina	(+4=5-0)
1991	Minsk, Soviet Union	Tournament	(+6=5-0)
1992	Kyiv, Ukraine	Match with (Ukraine) Nina Jankovskaja	(+3=7-0)
1993	Brunssum, Netherlands	Tournament	5 place (+3=6-2)
1994	match not played, title awarded		
1995	Bamako, Mali	Tournament	(+6=7-0)
1996	Vught, Netherlands	Match with (Netherlands) Karen van Lith	(+2-1)
1997	Mińsk Mazowiecki, Poland	Tournament	(+7=6-0)
1999	Yakutsk, Russia	Tournament	(+4=5-0) Match Zoja Golubeva-Nina Hoekman-Tatiana Teterina (5:4:3)
2000	Zutphen, Netherlands	Match with (Netherlands) Nina Hoekman	(+3 sets, 0 set)
2001	Velp, Netherlands	Tournament	11 place (+2=6-1)
2002	Riga, Latvia / Ufa, Russia	Match with (Russia) Tamara Tansykkuzhina	(+1 set, -2 set)
2003	Zoutelande, Netherlands	Tournament	2 place (+6=6-1)
2005	Latronico, Italia	Tournament	7 place (+3=5-3)
2007	Yakutsk	Tournament	5 place (+6=6-3)
2010	Ufa	Tournament	(+3=7-0)
2011	Dniprodzerzhynsk, Ukraine	Match with (Ukraine) Darya Tkachenko	(+1 set, -2 set)
2011	Rovno, Ukraine	Tournament	5 place (+3=10-0)
2013	Ulaanbaatar, Mongolia	Tournament	(+8=6-1)
2015	Astana, Kazakhstan	Match with (Russia) Tamara Tansykkuzhina	(+2=4-0)
2015	Wuhan, China	Tournament	(+6=8-1)
2017	Tallinn, Estonia	Tournament	(+6=9-0)
