= Tamara Tansykkuzhina =

Bashkir checkers player (born 1978)

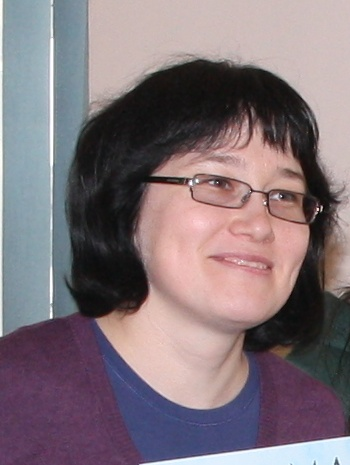
Tamara Tansykkuzhina in 2010

Tamara Mikhailovna Tansykkuzhina (Russian: Тамара Михайловна Тансыккужина; Bashkir: Тамара Танһыҡҡужина; born December 11, 1978, in Naberezhnye Chelny, Soviet Union) is a Russian international draughts player. She has won the Women's World Championship seven times, two times won Women's Draughts European Championship and is among the 20 best players in Russia regardless of gender. She was an honored guest at a festival held in her native Bashkortostan. In 2013 World Draughts Championship she took 8 place in group B.

She's a 7 time and the current Women's Draughts World Champion.

== Sport achievements ==
=== World Championship ===
- 2001, 2002, 2004, 2007, 2011, 2019, 2021 — 1st place

=== European Championship ===
- 2000, 2008 — 1st place

== Participation in World and European Championships ==
Year	Competition	Location	tournament/ match	Result	Place
1999	WC	(Russia) Yakutsk	tournament (Swiss system)	+3 =4 −2	6
2000	EC	(Ukraine) Zaporizhzhia	tournament (Swiss system)	+4 =4 −0	1
2001	WC	(Netherlands) Velp	tournament (Swiss system)	+5 =4 −0	1
2002	EC	(Lithuania) Vilnius	tournament (Swiss system)	+4 =3 −2	5
2002	WC	(Latvia) Riga / (Russia) Ufa	match with (Latvia) Zoja Golubeva	+2 −1	1
2003	WC	(Netherlands) Zoutelande	tournament	+3 =8 −2	5
2004	EC	(Poland) Mława	tournament (Swiss system)	+2 =7 −0	5
2004	WC	(Russia) Ufa	match with (Netherlands) Olga Kamyshleeva	+2 −1	1
2005	WC	(Italy) Latronico	tournament	+3 =7 −1	6
2006	EC	(Slovenia) Bovec	tournament (Swiss system)	+2 =7 −0	3
2007	WC	(Russia) Yakutsk	tournament	+6 =9 −0	1
2008	EC	(Estonia) Tallinn	tournament (Swiss system)	+3 =6 −0	1
2008	WC	(Ukraine) Dniprodzerzhynsk / (Russia) Ufa	match with (Ukraine) Darya Tkachenko	+0 −3	2
2010	EC	(Poland) Sępólno Krajeńskie	tournament (Swiss system)	+3 =6 −0	2
2010	WC	(Russia) Ufa	tournament	+0 =8 −2	5-6
2011	WC	(Ukraine) Rivne	tournament	+7 =5 −1	1
2013	WC	(Mongolia) Ulaanbaatar	tournament	+6 =8 −1	3
2014	EC	(Estonia) Tallinn	tournament (Swiss system)	+4 =5 −0	2
2015	WC	(Kazakhstan) Zerendi	match with (Latvia) Zoja Golubeva		2
2015	WC	(China) Wuhan	tournament	+5 =9 −1	5
2016	EC	(Turkey) İzmir	tournament (Swiss system)		6
2018	EC	(Turkey) İzmir	tournament (Swiss system)		4
2019	WC	(Russia) Yakutsk	tournament	+6 =8 −1	1
2021	WC	(Poland) Warsaw	match with (Poland) Natalia Sadowska		1
2021	WC	(Estonia) Tallinn	tournament	+8 =6 −1	2
