= Olga Fedorovich =

Belarusian draughts player

- Born: 28 October 1992 (age 33)
- Occupation: International draughts

Olga Fedorovich (born 28 October 1992) is a Belarusian draughts player, winner 2012 World Mind Sports Games in International draughts and was second in 2017 World Draughts Championship. She has become the champion of Belarus many times. Olga Fedorovich is a Women's International grandmaster (GMIF). Her sister Darja Fedorovich is also Belarusian draughts player.

== World Championship ==
- 2011 (4 place)
- 2013 (5 place)
- 2015 (4 place)
- 2017 (2 place)
- 2019 (6 place)
- 2021 (6 place)

== European Championship ==
- 2012 (8 place)
- 2014 (8 place)
- 2016 (8-9 place)

== Belarusian Championship ==
- 2009 (1 place)
- 2010 (2 place)
- 2011 (1 place)
- 2012 (2 place)
- 2013 (2 place)
- 2015 (1 place)
- 2016 (2 place)
- 2017 (2 place)
