= Darya Tkachenko =

Ukrainian draughts player (born 1983)

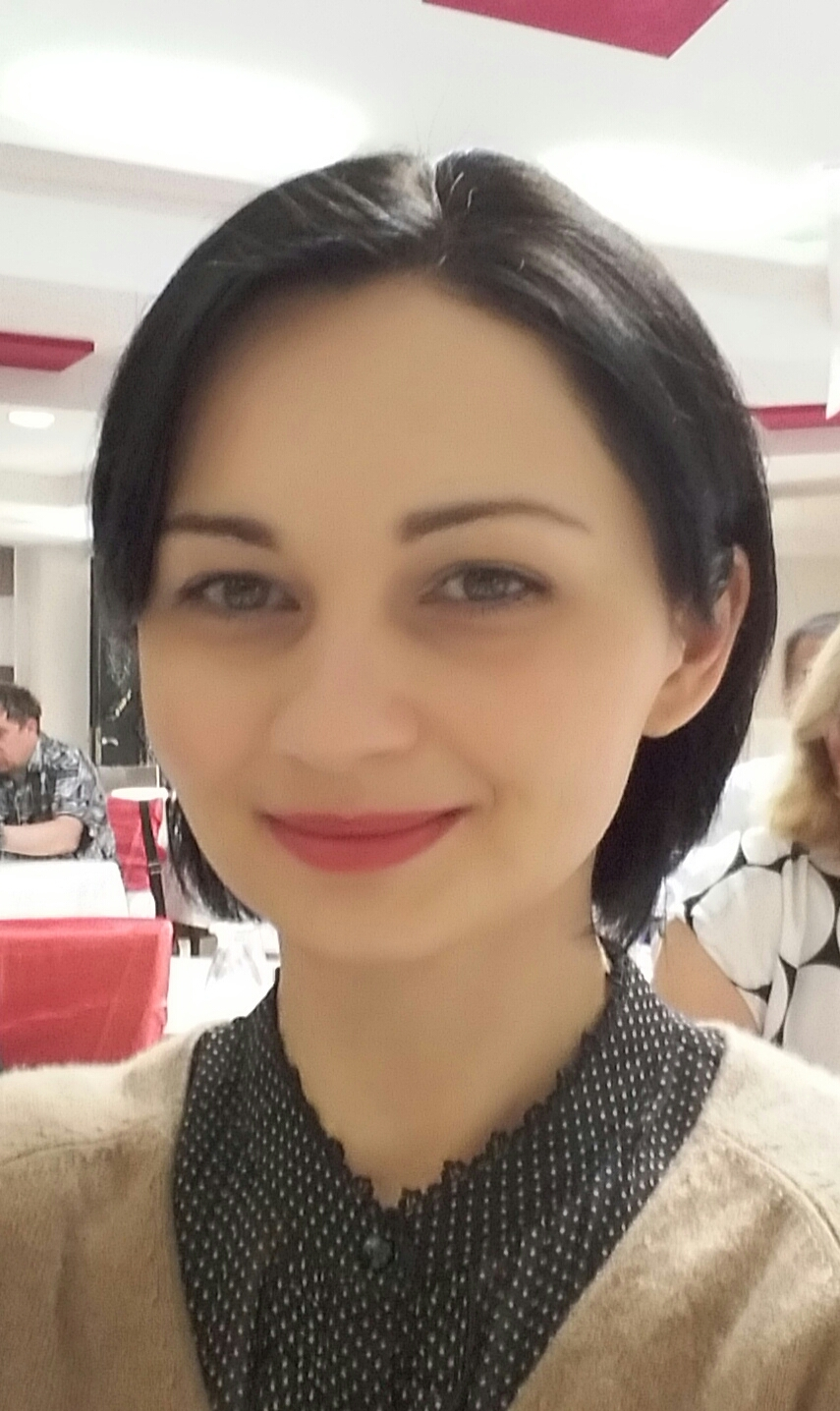
- Darya Tkachenko, 2005

Personal information
- Nationality: Ukrainian
- Citizenship: Refugee, currently living in the Netherlands
- Born: 21 December 1983 (age 42) Torez, Ukrainian SSR

Sport
- Country: Ukraine (until 2015); Russia (from 2016 until 2019)
- Sport: International draughts
- Club: Motor Sich Zaporizhzhia, Hijken DTC, WSDV, Wageningen
- Team: second team

Achievements and titles
- World finals: 2005: Gold; 2006: Gold; 2008: Gold; 2011: Gold; 2024: Gold
- Regional finals: Europe 2004: Gold; Europe 2006: Gold
- National finals: female champion of Ukraine in 2021
- Highest world ranking: FMJD rating: 2250 (July 1, 2007)

Darya Aleksandrovna Tkachenko (Ukrainian: Да́р'я Олекса́ндрівна Ткаче́нко; born 21 December 1983) is a Ukrainian draughts player holding the FMJD titles of FMJD Master (MF) and Women's International Grandmaster (GMIF). She is five-time women's world champion (2005, 2006, 2008, 2011, 2024) and twice women's European champion (2004, 2006) in international draughts. In 2016, she also won the women's world championship of Turkish draughts.

== Biography and career ==
Darya Tkachenko was born in Torez, Donetsk Oblast, Ukraine. She has finished high school in Snizhne, Donetsk Oblast, and then started her biology studies in Kyiv University. She graduated in 2004 and proceeded to post-graduate studies in the same university which she successfully finished in 2007. In 2008 she started working on her Doctoral thesis.

Darya started playing draughts when she was 10 years old. In November 1996, being less than 13 years old, she won a bronze medal at the Ukrainian Under 19 championships. In 1999 she became a European Under 19 champion. The next year she won this tournament again and also won a bronze medal at the World Under 19 championships. In 2001 she became a World Under 19 champion and won a seniors Ukrainian championship.

In 2003 she once again won the Ukrainian championships, in 2004 the senior European championships and in 2005 the World championships in Latronico. The next year she once again became a European and World champion, having won the World championship match again the Russian competitor Tamara Tansykkuzhina. She also won the European team cup with the "Pleso" team.

In 2007 Tkachenko lost her World title, letting Tansykkuzhina to the first place in the tournament held in Jakutsk, Russia, but the next year she was able to regain the championship after winning the match again her Russian counterpart. In 2007 and 2008, she won the European team cup twice more with the "Motor Sich" Zaporizhzhia. In 2010 Tkachenko lost both European and World championships, placing as low as 19th in Europe and 4th out of 6 participants in the World championship but in the next year returned the world title after defeating Zoja Golubeva in a three-set match.

== World and European seniors championships record ==
| Year | Compe- tition | Place | Competition type | Result | Placed |
|---|---|---|---|---|---|
| 2004 | EC | (Poland) Mława | Tournament | 4+ 5= 0- | 1 |
| 2005 | WC | (Italy) Latronico | Tournament | 6+ 5= 0- | 1 |
| 2006 | EC | (Slovenia) Bovec | Tournament | 4+ 5= 0- | 1 |
| 2006 | WC | (Russia) Yakutsk / (Ukraine) Kyiv | Match against (Russia) Tamara Tansykkuzhina | 2:1 by sets | 1 |
| 2007 | WC | (Russia) Yakutsk | Tournament | 6+ 8= 1- | 2 |
| 2008 | WC | (Russia) Ufa / (Ukraine) Dniprodzerzhynsk | Match against (Russia) Tamara Tansykkuzhina | 3:0 by sets | 1 |
| 2008 | EC | (Estonia) Tallinn | Tournament | 3+ 6= 0- | 2 |
| 2010 | EC | (Poland) Sępólno Krajeńskie | Tournament | 2+ 4= 3- | 19 |
| 2010 | WC | (Russia) Ufa | Tournament | 0+ 9= 1- | 4 |
| 2011 | WC | (Ukraine) Dniprodzerzhynsk | Match against (Latvia) Zoja Golubeva | 2:1 by sets | 1 |
| 2011 | WC | (Ukraine) Rivne | Tournament | 3+ 9= 1- | 6 |
| 2012 | EC | (Netherlands) Emmen | Tournament | 3+ 5= 1- | 5 |
| 2013 | WC | (Mongolia) Ulaanbaatar | Tournament | 7+ 7= 1- | 2 |
| 2014 | EC | (Estonia) Tallinn | Tournament | 4+ 3= 2- | 7 |
| 2016 | EC | (Turkey) İzmir | Tournament | 2+ 6= 1- | 11 |
| 2021 | WC | (Estonia) Tallinn | Tournament | 4+ 7= 4- | 10 |
| 2023 | WC | (Curaçao) Willemstad | Tournament | 7+ 7= 1- | 2 |
| 2024 | EC | (Italy) Chianciano Terme | Tournament | 2+ 7= 0- | 2 |
| 2024 | WC | (Netherlands) Wageningen | Match against (Ukraine) Viktoriya Motrichko | rapid round win after 12-12 draw | 1 |
