= Darja Fedorovich =

- Born: 28 October 1992 (age 33)
- Occupations: International draughts, Russian draughts

Darja Fedorovich (born 28 October 1992) is a Belarusian draughts player (Russian draughts, International draughts and Brazilian draughts), was third at the 2019 Women's World Draughts Championship (International draughts), was second and third at the world championship and twice second at European championship in Russian draughts. She has become the champion of Belarus many times. Darja Fedorovich is a Women's International grandmaster (GMIF) in draughts-64 and in International draughts. Coach Anatoli Gantvarg. Her sister Olga Fedorovich is also Belarusian draughts player.

== Russian draughts ==
=== World Championship ===
- 2011 (12 place in semifinal)
- 2013 (4 place)
- 2015 (4 place)
- 2017 (3 place)
- 2019 (2 place)

=== European Championship ===
- 2008 (3 place)
- 2014 (2 place)
- 2016 (2 place)
- 2025 (8 place)

=== Belarusian Championship ===
- 2007, 2008, 2017 – (1 place)
- 2009, 2013, 2014, 2016 – (2 place)
- 2018 (3 place)

== International draughts ==
=== World Championship ===
- 2017 (5 place)
- 2019 (3 place)
- 2021 (8 place)

=== European Championship ===
- 2012 (12 place)
- 2016 (5 place)

=== Belarusian Championship ===
- 2012, 2016 (1 place)
- 2009–2011, 2015, 2018, 2019 – (3 place)
