= Beilen =

- Town
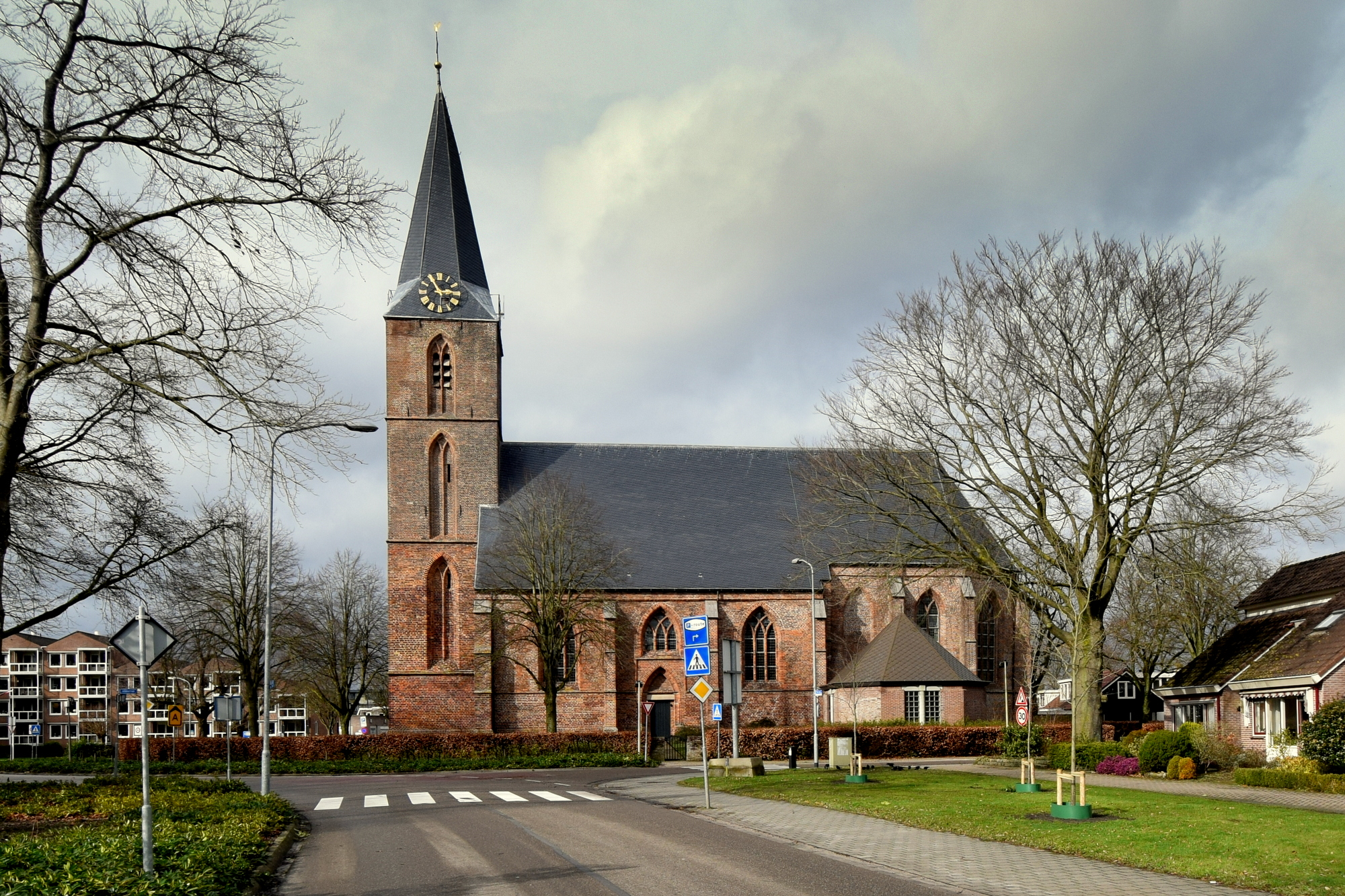
- Protestant Church in Beilen

- Flag Coat of arms

- Location in the Netherlands Beilen (Netherlands)
- Coordinates: 52°51′24″N 6°30′40″E
- Country: Netherlands
- Province: Drenthe
- Municipality: Midden-Drenthe

Area
  - Total: 50.01 km^{2} (19.31 sq mi)
- Elevation: 14 m (46 ft)

Population (2021)
  - Total: 10,925
  - Density: 218.5/km^{2} (565.8/sq mi)
- Time zone: UTC+1 (CET)
  - Summer (DST): UTC+2 (CEST)
- Postal code: 9411-9413
- Dialing code: 0593

Beilen is a town in the Dutch province of Drenthe. It is a part of the municipality of Midden-Drenthe, and lies about 16 km south of Assen. The old Reformed church is the only remaining truly old building; a large fire destroyed a major part of Beilen in 1820.

Beilen has a railway station - Beilen railway station.

The biggest employers in Beilen are the former DOMO milk powder factory and the psychiatric hospital GGZ Drenthe. The village is also home to a large distribution centre for the Jumbo supermarket chain. Beilen is also visited by many tourists, as it is located between many forests and National Reserves. Each August the so-called "Wende-aovends" take place in Beilen, featuring activities for children in the shopping center and showcases by local artists at night.

Until 1998, Beilen was a separate municipality.

== Education ==
There are four primary schools: Beatrix, GA de Ridder, De Eshorst, and Harm Smeenge. There is one secondary school: Volta.

== Gallery ==
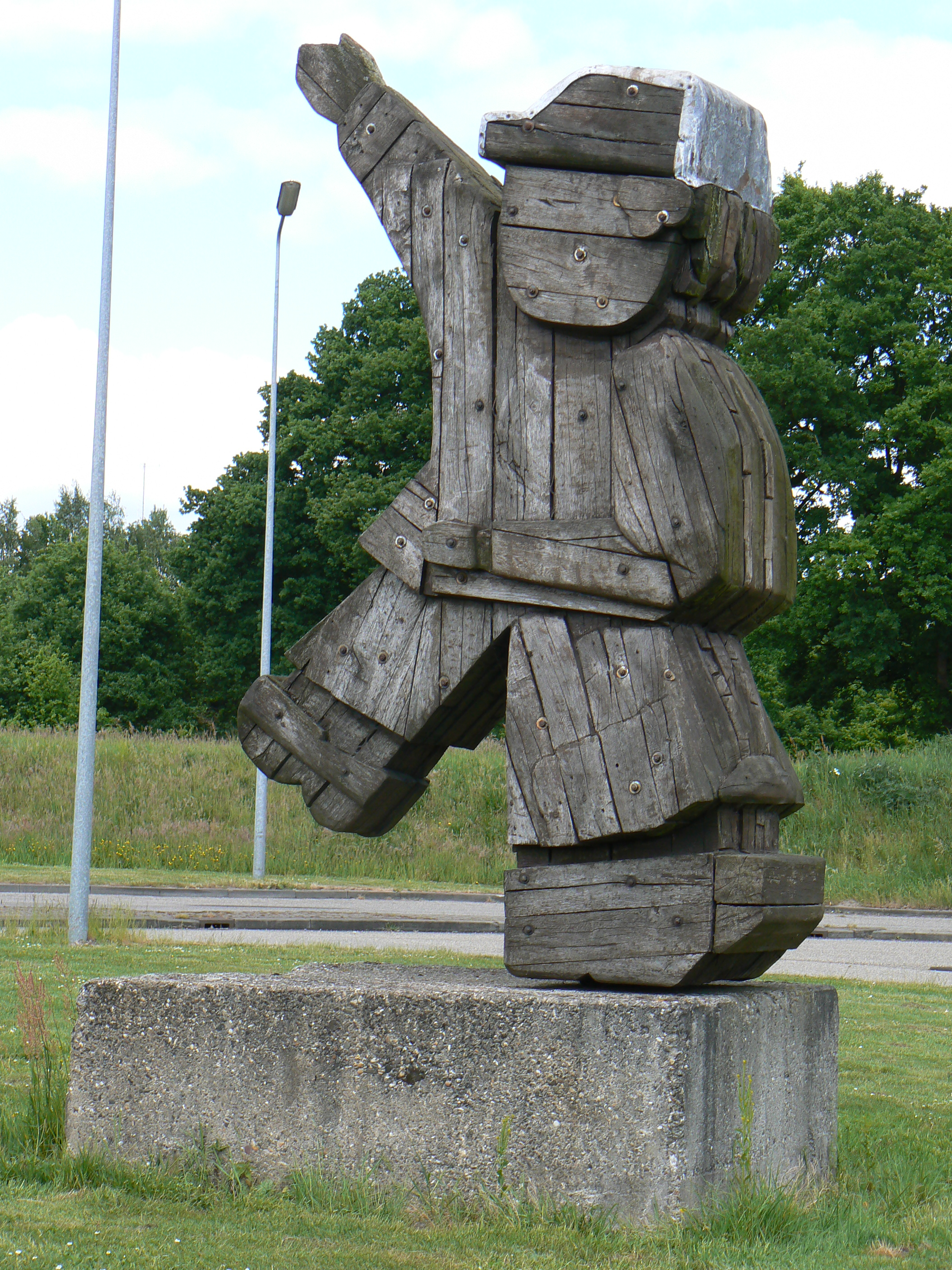
Statue on the round about

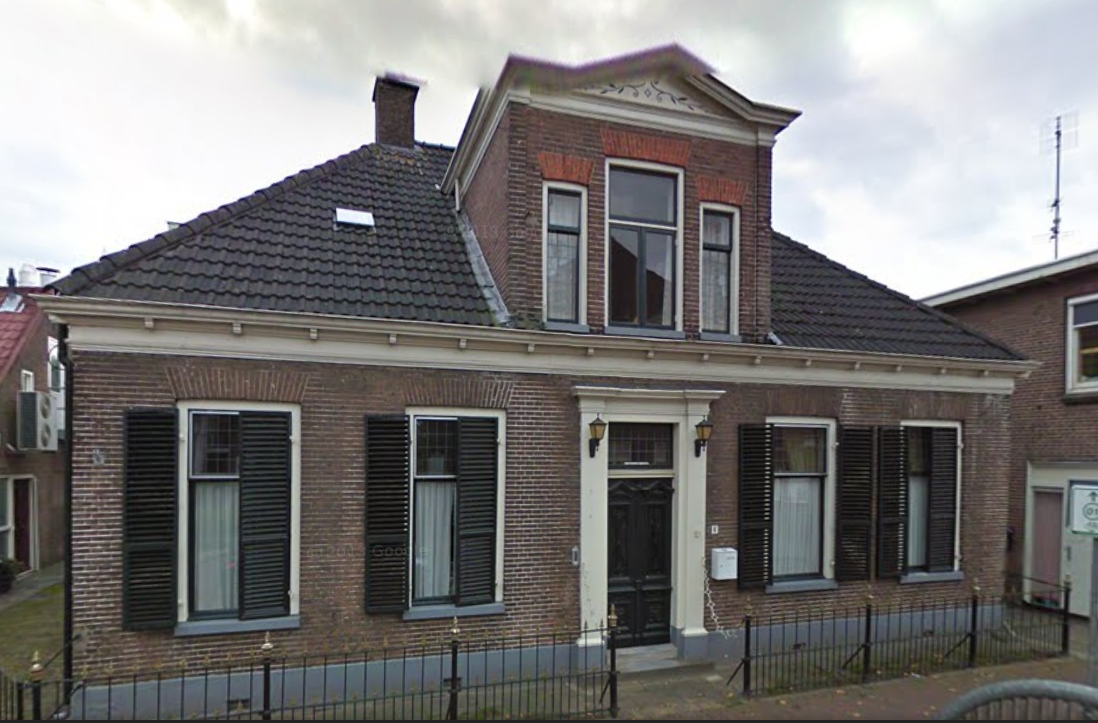
House in Beilen

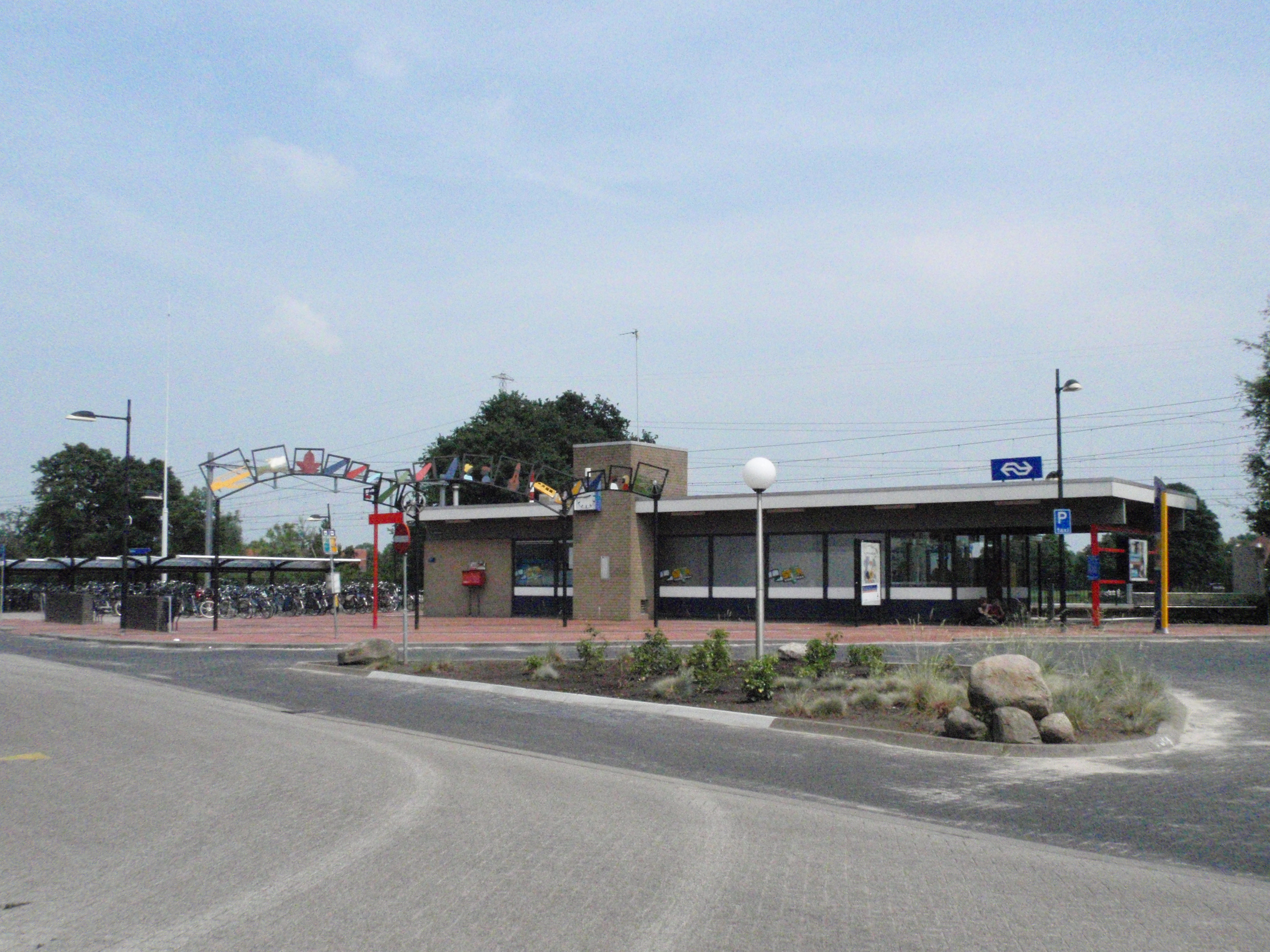
Railway station

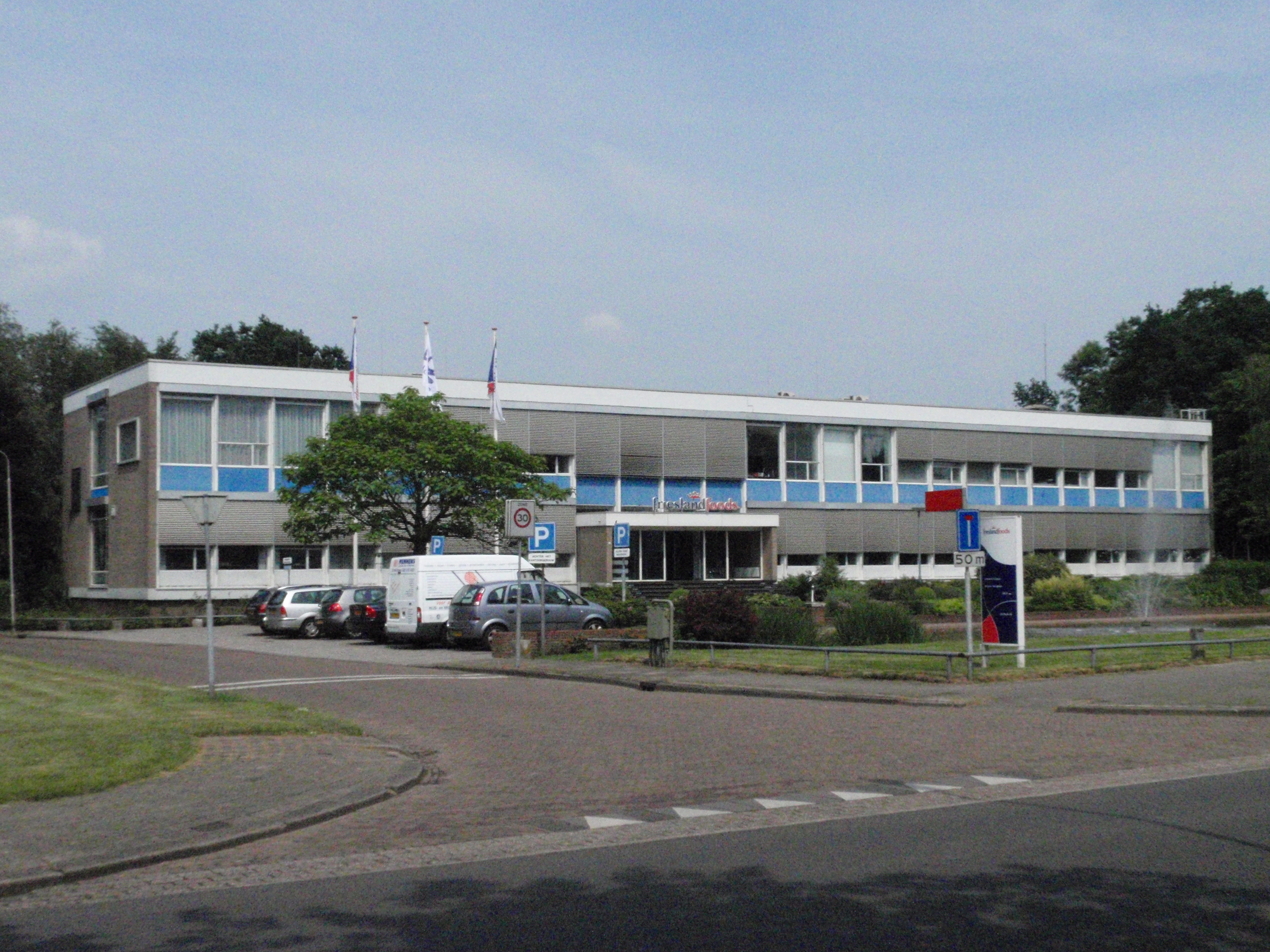
Dairy factory
