= Matrena Nogovitsyna =

Russian draughts player (born 1991)

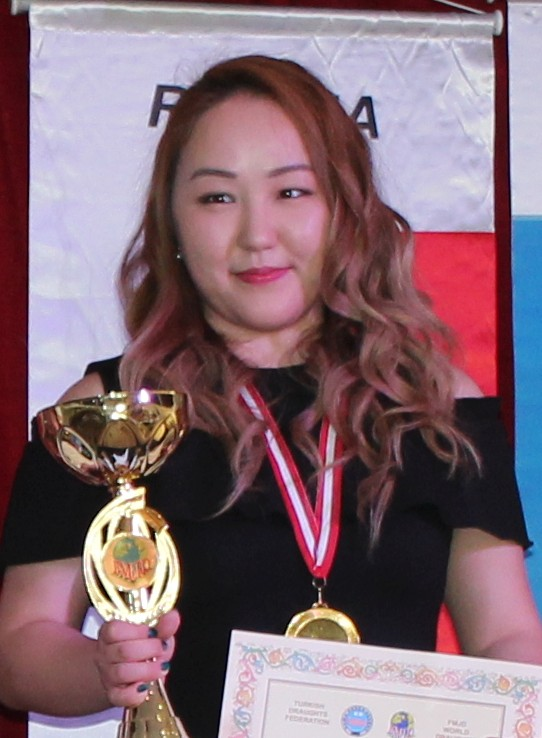
- Nogovitsyna in 2017
- Born: November 6, 1991 (age 34); Maralayy, Russia

Matrena Stepanovna Nogovitsyna (Russian: Матрёна Степановна Ноговицына, romanized: Matryona Stepanovna Nogovitsyna; born November 6, 1991) is a Russian player in the International draughts who won the women's world champion title in 2021. She was unable to defend this title due to the exclusion of Russian players from international events. She has been a champion player of Russia since 2004. Matrena Nogovitsyna is a Women's International grandmaster (GMIF). She is trained by Alexander Georgiev.

Matrena Nogovitsyna started to play draughts from eight years old. She emerged as runner-up at the 2011 Women's World Draughts Championship and was placed third at the 2010 Women's Draughts Championship. She is a two time women's draughts champion in blitz and three time women's draughts champion in rapid. She too was ranked as first at Women's European Draughts Championship (2018) and on 3 occasions third (2004, 2008 and 2016).

In 2021 she won a gold medal at Women's World Draughts Championship. It is her first world champion title.

== Participation in World and European Championships ==
Year	Championship	Host	Competition	Results	Place
2006	European	(Slovenia) Bovec	tournament	+2 =6 -1	10
2007	World	(Russia) Yakutsk	tournament	+4 =9 -2	8
2008	European	(Estonia) Tallinn	tournament	+4 =4 -1	3
2010	European	(Poland) Sępólno Krajeńskie	tournament	+3 =5 -1	4
2010	World	(Russia) Ufa	tournament	+0 =9 -1	3
2011	World	(Ukraine) Rovno	tournament	+6 =7 -0	2
2012	European	(Netherlands) Emmen	tournament	+1 =8 -0	14
2013	World	(Mongolia) Ulaanbaatar	tournament	+4 =9 -2	7
2014	European	(Estonia) Tallinn	tournament	+3 =5 -1	10
2015	World	(China) Wuhan	tournament	+4 =9 -2	7
2016	European	(Turkey) İzmir	tournament	+3 =6 -0	3
2018	European	(Russia) Moscow	tournament	+3 =6 -0	1
2021	World	(Estonia) Tallinn	tournament	+9 =6 -0	1
