= Olga Levina (draughts player) =

Personal information
- Full name: Olga Vadimivna Levina
- Nationality: Soviet Union; Ukrainian; Israeli
- Born: October 23, 1961 (age 64) Kharkiv, Ukrainian SSR, Soviet Union
- Website: http://www.isra-trainings.com

Sport
- Sport: International draughts
- Team: Soviet Union
- Retired: 1995

Achievements and titles
- World finals: Gold(1981, 1987, 1989, 1993)

Olga Levina (Ukrainian: Ольга Вадимівна Левина, Olha Vadymivna Levyna; Russian: Ольга Вадимовна Левина; born October 23, 1961) is a retired International draughts player and 4 times Women's World Champion in International draughts. Levina is a Kharkiv University alumnus. Her father, Vadim Levin, is a poet and translator, an author of numerous books for children.

== Career ==
Olga Levina started her professional career as a Russian draughts player but once having, in 10th grade, reached a Master's level, the highest possible in this variant of draughts, has switched to International draughts. In 1981, as 19-year-old, she won her first World title. In 1986 she was awarded an International Grandmaster title.

She clinched World championship title three more times, in 1987, 1989 and 1993. Her victory in Rosmalen in 1989 was particularly impressive as she managed to win all her games at that championship.

In 1995, Olga Levina emigrated to Israel and settled in Haifa. The same year she participated for the last time in the World championships; after realizing that the Israeli sports authorities cannot provide her with the kind of support she was used to in the Soviet Union, she decided to retire. Today she is a certified specialist in Neuro-linguistic programming and a traditional Reiki Master.
