= World Draughts Federation =

International draughts governing body

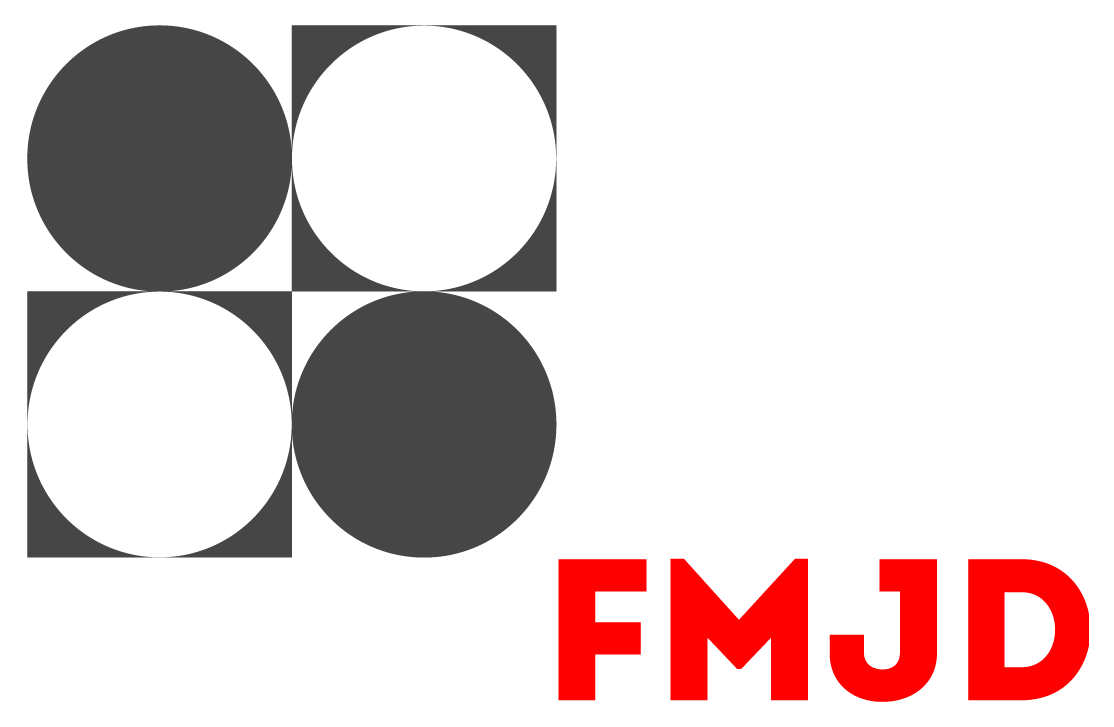
- Sport: Draughts
- Jurisdiction: International
- Abbreviation: FMJD
- Founded: 1947
- Headquarters: Lauzanne, Switzerland
- President: (Estonia) Janek Mäggi
- Vice president: (China) Guo Yujun
- Director: (United States) Lyublyana Turiy, (Poland) Magda Pawlowska
- Secretary: (Netherlands) Jan van Dijk

Official website
- www.fmjd.org

The World Draughts Federation (Fédération Mondiale du Jeu de Dames) FMJD, is the international body uniting national draughts federations. It was founded in 1947 by four Federations: France, the Netherlands, Belgium and Switzerland.

== Members ==
Currently, the FMJD has more than 70 national federation members in 2021. Recently the FMJD has become a member of the Global Association of International Sports Federations and strives for Olympic recognition. The FMJD memberships is part of a more general movement toward integration of Mind Sports in the regular sports arena, a development that, in the vision of the FMJD, is to be lauded.

The FMJD is member of the:

- General Association of International Sports Federations (GAISF)
- International Mind Sports Association (IMSA)

== Presidents ==
1. 1947: J. H. Willems, Netherlands
2. 1968: Beppino Rizzi, Italy
3. 1975: Huib van de Vreugde, Netherlands
4. 1978: Piet Roozenburg, Netherlands
5. 1980: Wim Jurg, Netherlands
6. 1984: Vadim Bairamov, Soviet Union
7. 1985: Piet Roozenburg, Netherlands (interim)
8. 1986: Piet Roozenburg, Netherlands
9. 1990: Vadim Bairamov, Soviet Union
10. 1991: Chr. H. ten Haaf, Netherlands
11. 1992: Gaetano Mazzilli, Italy (interim)
12. 1992: Wouter van Beek, Netherlands
13. 2003: Ivan Shovkoplias, Ukraine
14. 2005: Vladimir Ptitsyn, Russia
15. 2009: Harry Otten, Netherlands
16. 2017: Janek Mäggi, Estonia
17. 2021: Jacek Pawlicki, Poland
18. 2025: Janek Mäggi, Estonia

== Disciplines ==
International draughts at 100 squares, Russian and Brazilian 64 and checkers:

- Online Checkers - Online Draughts
- Checkers
- 64 Russian Draughts and Brazilian Draughts
- Turkish Draughts

== Global Championships ==
- World Checkers/Draughts Championship in English draughts since 1840
- Draughts World Championship in international draughts since 1885
- Women's World Draughts Championship in international draughts since 1973
- Draughts-64 World Championships since 1985
- World Youth Draughts Championships since 1972

== Regional Championships ==
- African Draughts Championships - since 1980
- Asian Draughts Championships - since 1999
- European Draughts Championships - since 1965
- Panamerican Draughts Championship - since 1980

== Regions ==
- African Draughts Confederation (CAJD).
- Asian Draughts Confederation As of 2018, has 26 member federations (12 countries are full members and 14 candidate members).
- European Draughts Confederation
- Pan American Draughts Confederation

== Members ==
In June 2021 have 77 members:

Africa (17) / Americas (14) / Asia (12) / Oceania (2) / Europe (32)

Members in 2014:

=== Africa (16) ===
- (Benin) – Fédération Béninoise de Jeu de Dames (FEBEJED)
- (Burkina Faso) – Federation Burkinabe du Jeu de Dames
- (Cameroon) – Federation Camerounaise de Jeu de Dames
- (Republic of the Congo) – Federation Congolaise du Jeu de Dames FNDA
- (Ivory Coast) – Federation Ivoirienne du Jeu de Dames
- (The Gambia) – Gambian National Draughts Federation
- (Guinea) – Federation Guinéenne du Jeu de Dames et des Echecs
- (Mali) – Federation Malienne du Jeu de Dames
- (Mauritania) – Federation Mauritanienne du Jeu de Dames
- (Niger) – Association Nigérienne du jeu de Dames
- (Senegal) – Federation Senegalaise du Jeu de Dames
- (Somalia) – Somali Draughts Sport Association
- – Mind Sports South Africa
- – Association du jeu de Dames Togo
- – Uganda Draughts Federation

=== Americas (13) ===
- – Barbados Draughts Association
- (Brazil) – Confederacao Brasileira de Jogo de Damas
- (Canada) – Federation Canadienne du jeu de Dames
- (Costa Rica) – Asociacion Costarricense del Juego de Damas
- (Curaçao) – Curaçaose Dambond
- (Dominican Republic) – Federacion Dominicana de Juego de Damas
- – Grenada Draughts Association
- (Haiti) – Federation Haitienne du Jeu de Dames
- – Jamaica Board Games Foundation
- (Panama) – Asociacion Panamena de Juego de Damas
- (Suriname) – Surinaamse Dambond
- – Trinidad and Tobago Draughts Association
- (United States) – International Checkers Association of North America / The American Checker Federation / American Pool Checker Association

=== Asia (8) ===
- (China) – Chinese Draughts Association
- – Draughts Federation of India
- (Japan) – Japanese draughts association
- (Kazakhstan) – Draughts Federation of Kazachstan
- (Mongolia) – Mongolian Federation of Draughts
- (Pakistan) – Pak Draughts Federation
- – Draughts Federation of Turkmenistan
- – Uzbekistan Draughts Federation

=== Oceania (2) ===
- (Australia) – Australian Draughts Federation
- – New Zealand Draughts Association

=== Europe (27) ===
- (Armenia) – Armenian Draughts Federation
- – Azerbaijan Draughts Federation
- – Belarus Draughts Federation
- (Belgium) – Koninklijke Belgische Dambond
- (Bulgaria) – Bulgarian Draughts Federation
- (Croatia) – Croatian Draughts Federation
- (Czech Republic) – Ceska Federace Damy
- (England) – English Draughts Association
- (Estonia) – Estonian Draughts Federation
- (France) – Federation francaise du jeu de dames
- (Georgia (country)) – Georgian Draughts Federation
- (Germany) – Interessengemeinschaft Damespiel in Deutschland
- – Hungary Draughts Federation
- (Israel) – Israeli Draughts Federation
- (Italy) – Federazione Italiana Dama
- (Latvia) – Latvian Draughts Union
- (Lithuania) – Lithuanian Draughts Federation
- – Draughts Federation of Moldova
- (Netherlands) – Koninklijke Nederlandse Dambond
- (Poland) – Polish Draughts Federation
- (Portugal) – Federação Portuguesa de Damas
- – The Draughts Federation of Russia
- (Slovenia) – Slovene Draughts Federation
- (Switzerland) – Federation Suisse du Jeu de Dames
- (Turkey) – Türkiye Dama Federation
- (Ukraine) – Ukrainian Draughts Federation
- (Wales) – Cymdeithas Draffts Cymru

== See also ==
- International draughts
- Draughts
- World Mind Sports Games
- SportAccord World Mind Games
