= List of draughts players =

List of draughts players is concerned with the leading or champion figures in the history of various forms of draughts. The list should be limited to those who are notable in the game or its history.

== Champions or masters in variants of draughts ==
- Abel Verse (France)
- Alatenghua (China)
- Alex Moiseyev (United States)
- Alexander Baljakin (Netherlands)
- Alexander Dybman (Soviet Union)
- Alexander Georgiev (Russia)
- Alexander Getmanski (also spelled as "Aleksandr Getmanski") (Russia)
- Aleksander Kandaurov (Russia)
- Alexander Schwarzman (Russia)
- Alexei Chizhov (Russia)
- Alfred Dussaut (France)
- Alfred Jordan (England) – A World Checkers/Draughts Champion
- Alfred Molimard (France)
- Amangul Durdyyeva (England)
- Anatoli Gantvarg (Belarus)
- Andrej Kalmakov
- Andrew Anderson (Scotland)
- Andris Andreiko (Latvia)
- Arnaud Cordier (France)
- Asa Long (United States)
- Baba Sy (Senegal)
- Ben Springer (Netherlands)
- Bryan Wollaert (Netherlands)
- Carl "Buster" Smith – Champion in Pool checkers. (United States)
- Charles Walker (United States)
- Cornelius "Con" McCarrick
- Darya Tkachenko (Ukraine)
- Dennis Pawlek
- Derek Oldbury (England)
- Don Lafferty (England)
- Donald Oliphant
- Dul Erdenebileg (Mongolia)
- Edvardas Bužinskis (Lithuania)
- Edwin Hunt (United States)
- Elbert Lowder (United States)
- Elena Altsjoel – A Women's International Draughts Champion (Belarus)
- Elena Mikhailovskaya – First Women's International Draughts Champion (Russia)
- Eugène Leclercq – A Men's International Draughts Champion (France)
- Gérard Jansen
- Guntis Valneris (Latvia)
- Hanqing Zhao (China)
- Harm Wiersma (Netherlands)
- Herman Hoogland (Netherlands)
- Hugo Verpoest
- Ion Dosca (Moldova)
- Iser Kuperman (Russia)
- Isidore Weiss (France)
- Jack de Haas (Netherlands)
- Jake Kacher
- James Ferrie – A World Checkers/Draughts Champion (Scotland)
- James Wyllie (Scotland)
- Jan Groenendijk (Netherlands)
- Jan Mortimer (New Zealand)
- Jannes van der Wal (Netherlands)
- Jean Marc Ndjofang (Netherlands)
- John Sadiek (Cameroon)
- Karen van Lith (Suriname)
- Leopold Sekongo (Netherlands)
- Li Tchoan King (China)
- Lindus Edwards
- Lourival Mendes França (Brazil)
- Lubabalo Kondlo (South Africa)
- Lukas Valenta
- Marcel Deslauriers (Canada)
- Future Is Near
- Marion Tinsley – He is considered the greatest American-checkers player ever. (United States)
- Marius Fabre (France)
- Maurice Raichenbach (France)
- Michael Kats
- Michele Borghetti (Italy)
- Nadiya Chyzhevska
- Natalia Sadowska (Poland)
- N'Diaga Samb (Senegal)
- Newell W. Banks (United States)
- Nina Hoekman (Ukraine)
- Olga Kamyshleeva – A Women's International Draughts Champion (Netherlands)
- Olga Levina (Ukraine)
- Oscar Verpoest
- Patricia Breen (Republic of Ireland)
- Pierre Ghestem (France)
- Piet Roozenburg (Netherlands)
- Raivo Rist
- Rashid Nezhmetdinov (Soviet Union)
- Reinier Cornelis Keller
- Richard Fortman (United States)
- Rob Clerc (Netherlands)
- Robert Martins – A World Checkers/Draughts Champion (England)
- Robert Stewart – A World Checkers/Draughts Champion (Scotland)
- Robert D. Yates (United States)
- Roel Boomstra (Netherlands)
- Ron King (Barbados)
- Ryan Pronk (United States)
- Sam Gonotsky (United States)
- Stanislas Bizot (France)
- Tamara Tansykkuzhina (Russia)
- Tanja Chub (Ukraine)
- Ton Sijbrands (Netherlands)
- Vadim Virny (Germany)
- Viktoriya Motrichko (Ukraine)
- Vladimir Kaplan (Russia)
- Vyacheslav Shchyogolev (Russia)
- Walter Hellman (United States)
- William F. Ryan (United States)
- Wim de Jong
- Yulia Makarenkova (Ukraine)
- Zoja Golubeva (Latvia)

== Non-human players ==
This section is for computer programs who are noted in the history of the game.

- Chinook (draughts player), a program developed at the University of Alberta (noteworthy match against Marion Tinsley)
- KingsRow, a strong program by Ed Gilbert
- Nemesis (draughts player), world computer champion in 2002
