= 2012 World Mind Sports Games =

Tournament

The 2012 World Mind Sports Games were held in Lille, France, from 9 to 23 August 2012. The meeting started during the 2012 Summer Olympics and ending shortly before the 2012 Summer Paralympics, both in London. This was the second rendition of the World Mind Sports Games, which was inaugurated in 2008 in Beijing. The mind sport games had about 2000 players from 95 nations—down from 2,763 competitors and 143 countries at the 1st Games. More than half of the gold medals were contested at draughts and Russia, with the strongest draughts squad, won the most gold and most overall medals. China won five gold medals—all five events contested at Xiangqi. Chinese Taipei won four gold medals—four of the five events contested at go.

== Events ==
There were 29 set of medals:

- Bridge (3)
- Draughts (16)
- Chess (0)
- Go (5)
- Xiangqi (5)

== Bridge ==
There were only three WMSG medal events at contract bridge in the 2012 Games, down from nine for the 2008 World Mind Sports Games. One other World Bridge Federation (WBF) event with world championship status was contested on site, the World Mixed Teams Championship for transnational mixed teams, which field male–female pairs only. The main events were parallel tournaments for open, women, and seniors national teams, 4 to 6 players, some with a non-playing captain and/or a coach (that is, the events of the quadrennial World Team Olympiad, 1960 to 2004, retrospectively termed the 1st to 12th World Bridge Games). They were conducted over the full 14 days of competition; the mixed teams over the latter 7 days, alongside the quarterfinal, semifinal, and final matches of the main events.

Seven WMSG medal events from 2008 were not repeated as part of the "2nd World Mind Games, 14th World Bridge Games" (as WBF called the meet). Open, women, and youth individual events and under-28 teams were not repeated anywhere. Youth pairs, under-26 teams, and under-21 teams were contested at separate all-Youth meets—along with u-26 Girls Teams, which was not part of the 1st Games.

The world championship for national seniors teams (World Team Olympiad#Senior International Cup), which had been a WMSG non-medal event alongside the open and women flights in 2008, was now a WMSG medal event. Beside the mixed teams world championship, there were lesser side events.

World Bridge Games medalists
Event	Gold	Silver	Bronze
Team (Open)	Sweden	Poland	Monaco
Team (Women)	England	Russia	Poland
Team (Seniors)	Hungary	United States	France

Only 60 and 43 nations entered the open and women flights, down from 71 and 54 at the 2008 Games. The seniors field, now a WMSG medal event as well as WBF world championship, increased from 32 to 34 entries.

The six gold and bronze medalists all won their concluding matches comfortably, in the end (scores no closer than 170–118 in 80 deals, the Women bronze medal match).

The European Bridge League, with about half of all entries, placed 7 teams in both the Open and Women quarterfinals, all 4 teams in those medal rounds; 6 quarterfinalists and 3 semifinalists in the Seniors flight. The other quarterfinalists were USA in the Open and Seniors, Indonesia in the Women and Seniors.

Participation

65 bridge nations were represented by at least one Open, Women, or Seniors team; 30 entered all three flights. The Open field of 60 included 30 from the European Bridge League. There were 43 in the women field including four that did not enter the Open: Lebanon, Palestine, Indonesia (a championship contender), and the Philippines. There were 34 in the seniors including one that did not enter either of the other flights: Hungary, which won the seniors championship.

== Chess ==
There were no WMSG medal events in chess at the 2nd Games.

One website devoted to chess treated the inaugural SportAccord World Mind Games, December 2011 in Beijing, as the second rendition of the World Mind Sports Games, inaugurated October 2008 in Beijing.

"The World Mind Sports Games were first held in 2008 in Beijing. After a long pause the tournament returns in the chess calendar stronger than ever.
This year the World Mind Games has moved to a new level. Now they are being organized and held by a famous and respectable organization called SportAccord, the umbrella organization for both Olympic and non-Olympic sports as well as a major organizers of conferences and sporting events."

There were "Rapid" tournaments, 25-minute or 5-minute, on the first Saturday, second Friday, and second Sunday at least.

On first Sunday afternoon, the third day of the competitive program, International Grand Master Tigran Gharamian played simultaneous matches at 30 tables, against a field including many children as young as age six. (The chess program at the 2nd Games was largely instructional.) There was a second simultaneous display featuring Gharamian on the second Saturday morning. Gharamian was a local player, a 28-year-old Armenian who had emigrated to Lille ten years earlier. Gharamian defeated all 30 players in the first session and 20 of 22 in the second session.

There was at least one "Youth Tournament" and one Blitz tournament.

== Draughts ==
The 2nd Games included 16 WMSG medal events in draughts. Squads from Netherlands, Russia, and Ukraine won at least three gold medals. Individual medalists included Alexei Chizhov, Roel Boomstra, Nina Hoekman, and Alexander Schwarzman.

The World Draughts Federation (FMJD) officially announced the roster of 16 events and the conditions ("without any support for hospitality and travel") only five months in advance. The two checkers events, for men and women, were the world championship qualification tournaments and were supported by prizes including 1000 euro for first place.

8 disciplines, 2 events each
Dates	Discipline
Friday 10 August – Saturday 18 August	Draughts-100 World Cup, classic
Sunday 19 August – Monday 20 August	Draughts-100 World Championship, rapid
Thursday 16 August – Tuesday 21 August	Draughts-64 (Brazilian draughts for men, Russian draughts for women), classic
Tuesday 21 August	Draughts-100 World Championship, rapid (teams)
Wednesday 22 August	Draughts-64 (Brazilian draughts for men, Russian draughts for women), blitz
Wednesday 22 August	Checkers (English draughts)
Wednesday 22 August	Draughts-100 World Championship, blitz
Thursday 23 August	Draughts-100 World Championship, blitz (teams)

The main event of the draughts program covering the first nine days was the Draughts World Cup, a 9-round Swiss-system tournament in which every match yields a winner by 12–0, 9–3, 8–4, or 7–5 score, depending on whether 0, 1, 2, or 3 tie-breaks generate the winner. The final standings show 82 open players, 39 women.

Draughts World Cup
Event	Gold	Silver	Bronze
International draughts – classic (men)	(Russia) Alexei Chizhov	(Russia) Alexander Schwarzman	(Netherlands) Roel Boomstra
International draughts – classic (women)	(Belarus) Olga Fedorovich	(Netherlands) Nina Hoekman	(Poland) Natalia Sadowska
International draughts – rapid (men)	(Netherlands) Roel Boomstra	(Russia) Alexei Chizhov	(Russia) Ainur Shaibakov
International draughts – rapid (women)	(Netherlands) Nina Hoekman	(Ukraine) Viktoriya Motrichko	(Russia) Aianika Kychkina
International draughts – rapid (men's teams)	Russia	Netherlands	Cameroon
International draughts – rapid (women's teams)	Ukraine	Russia	Netherlands
International draughts – blitz (men)	(Russia) Alexander Schwarzman	(Russia) Alexander Getmanski	(Netherlands) Roel Boomstra
International draughts – blitz (women)	(Russia) Aygul Idrisova	(Russia) Matrena Nogovitsyna	(Ukraine) Olga Baltazhy
International draughts – blitz (men's team)	Russia	Latvia	Netherlands
International draughts – blitz (women's team)	Netherlands	Russia	Mongolia
Russian draughts – classic (women)	(Ukraine) Yulia Makarenkova	(Russia) Stepanida Kirillina	(Russia) Zhanna Sarshayeva
Russian draughts – blitz (women)	(Russia) Stepanida Kirillina	(Russia) Zhanna Sarshayeva	(Ukraine) Yulia Makarenkova
Brazilian draughts – classic (men)	(Russia) Gavril Kolesov	(Russia) Nikolai Germogenov	(Russia) Oleg Dashkov
Brazilian draughts – blitz (men)	(Ukraine) Denys Shkatula	(Ukraine) Sergey Belosheev	(Russia) Gavril Kolesov
Checkers (men)	(Italy) Michele Borghetti	(Italy) Sergio Scarpetta	(Turkmenistan) Bashim Durdyev
Checkers (women)	(Ukraine) Nadiya Chyzhevska	(Turkmenistan) Amangul Berdieva	(Italy) Erika Rosso

== Go ==
Five WMSG medal events were included in the 2nd Games. The Chinese Taipei squad won 11 of 15 medals, including four gold.

South Korea and China had won 14 of the 18 medals in the six events contested at the 1st Games in Beijing; North Korea 1 medal. They did not compete in the 2nd Games. Nor did the only Chinese Taipei medalist in Beijing, the silver medal pair.

Go events were held over eleven days, from 13 to 23 August (last 11 days of the 14-day Open Teams bridge tournament). The individual tournaments for men and women were contested between 13–16 August, the teams competition between 17–19 August, the youth and pair events between 20–23 August.

The men, women, and pair events, at least, were repeats from 2008; the youth event new. The team event replaced open, men's team, and women's team events.

78 men and 38 women played five rounds to qualify four semifinalists each. Both preliminary leaders won the gold medals.

30 teams played five rounds in two groups to qualify two semifinalists from each group. There were 21 nations represented, nine in both groups, and both Chinese Taipei teams won their groups.

20 mixed pairs (male–female) played five rounds in two groups to qualify two semifinalists from each group. There were 14 nations represented, six in both groups, and both Chinese Taipei teams won their groups. But the Group A runners-up beat the A winners in the gold medal match.

43 youth played five rounds to qualify four semifinalists. Again the preliminary runner-up beat the prelim winner in the gold medal match.

Event	Gold	Silver	Bronze
Men	(Chinese Taipei) Lai Yu-Cheng	(Chinese Taipei) Kuo Nai-Fu	(Chinese Taipei) Lo Sheng-Chieh
Women	(Chinese Taipei) Lin Hsiao-Tung	(Japan) Maya Osawa	(Canada) Sarah Yu
Teams	Chinese Taipei 1	Chinese Taipei 2	Singapore
Youth (under-21)	(Chinese Taipei) Kuo Nai-Fu	(Chinese Taipei) Tsai Cheng-Wei	(Chinese Taipei) Hsu Hao-Hung
Pairs (female–male)	(Japan) Maya Osawa – Riki Nakasone	(Chinese Taipei) Lin Hsiao-Tung – Hung Hsin-Wei	(Chinese Taipei) Lu Yu-Hua – Lai Yu-Cheng

== Xiangqi ==
Five WMSG medal events were included in the 2nd Games. China won 13 of 15 medals.

The World Xiangqi Federation (WXF) shows "News from Europe" that players from China squad won all six medals in the two Rapid events (women and men) completed 11 August.

China also won all six medals in the two individual events, with only one change in personnel from the Rapid events. Its Individual Men gold and silver medalists won the Teams (two players) followed by Vietnam and Hong Kong.

There was one change from the five events contested in 2008, Rapid (Women) in place of Team (Women).

Event	Gold	Silver	Bronze
Rapid (Women)	(China) Li Chun Chen	(China) Dan Tang	(China) Bing Han
Individual (Women)	(China) Li Chun Chen	(China) Dan Tang	(China) Bing Han
Rapid (Men)	(China) Jing Xie	(China) Chuan Jiang	(China) Qiang Zhang
Individual (Men)	(China) Chunlin Wan	(China) Jing Xie	(China) Qiang Zhang
Team (Men)	China	Vietnam	Hong Kong

== Medals ==
* Host nation (France)

Rank	Nation	Gold	Silver	Bronze	Total
1	Russia	7	10	5	22
2	China	5	4	4	13
3	Chinese Taipei	4	4	3	11
4	Ukraine	4	2	2	8
5	Netherlands	3	2	4	9
6	Italy	1	1	1	3
7	Japan	1	1	0	2
8	Belarus	1	0	0	1
8	England	1	0	0	1
8	Hungary	1	0	0	1
8	Sweden	1	0	0	1
12	Poland	0	1	2	3
13	Turkmenistan	0	1	1	2
14	Latvia	0	1	0	1
14	United States	0	1	0	1
14	Vietnam	0	1	0	1
17	Cameroon	0	0	1	1
17	Canada	0	0	1	1
17	France*	0	0	1	1
17	Hong Kong	0	0	1	1
17	Monaco	0	0	1	1
17	Mongolia	0	0	1	1
17	Singapore	0	0	1	1
Totals (23 entries)		29	29	29	87
