= World Checkers Championship =

Checkers tournament

The World Checkers/Draughts Championship is the tournament of English draughts (also known as "American checkers" or "straight checkers") which determines the world champion. It is organised by the World Checkers/Draughts Federation. The first edition of the men's championship was held in the 1840s, predating the international draughts world championship by several decades. The women's championship has been held since 1986. There are championships held in two versions. One is 3-Move, where players don't begin their game in the starting position but a position three moves in the game (often drawn randomly from all positions, excluding positions already losing a piece). The other is GAYP (Go as you please), where players start from the very beginning.

== Men ==
Year	Winner	Nationality
1840–1844	Andrew Anderson	Scotland
1844–1847	James Wyllie	Scotland
1847–1849	Andrew Anderson	Scotland
1849–1859	James Wyllie	Scotland
1859–1864	Robert Martins	Scotland
1864–1876	James Wyllie	Scotland
1876–1878	Robert D. Yates	United States
1878–1894	James Wyllie	Scotland
1894–1896	James Ferrie	Scotland
1896–1903	Richard Jordan	Scotland
1903–1912	James Ferrie	Scotland
1912–1917	Alfred Jordan	England
1917–1922	Newell Banks	United States
1922–1933	Robert Stewart	Scotland
1933–1934	Newell Banks	United States
1934–1948	Asa Long	United States
1948–1955	Walter Hellman	United States
1955–1958	Marion Tinsley	United States
1958–1975	Walter Hellman	United States
1975–1991	Marion Tinsley	United States
1991–1994	Derek Oldbury	England

GAYP
Year	Winner	Nationality
1994–2014	Ron King	Barbados
2014–2016	Sergio Scarpetta	Italy
2016–2018	Michele Borghetti	Italy
2018–2022	Lubabalo Kondlo	South Africa
2022–	Matteo Bernini	Italy

3-Move
Year	Winner	Nationality
1994–2002	Ron King	Barbados
2003–2013	Alex Moiseyev	United States
2013–2017	Michele Borghetti	Italy
2017–	Sergio Scarpetta	Italy

== Women ==
GAYP
Year	Winner	Nationality
2006–2012	Amangul Durdyyeva	Turkmenistan
2013–2015	Nadiya Chyzhevska	Ukraine
2015–2017	Amangul Durdyyeva	Turkmenistan
2017–	Nadiya Chyzhevska	Ukraine

3-Move
Year	Winner	Nationality
1986–1993	Joan Caws	United Kingdom
1993–2007	Patricia Breen	Ireland
2007–2012	Amangul Durdyyeva	Turkmenistan
2012–2016	Nadiya Chyzhevska	Ukraine
2016–2018	Amangul Durdyyeva	Turkmenistan
2018—	Tetiana Zaitseva	Ukraine

== See also ==
- List of world championships in mind sports
