= IMSA Elite Mind Games =

International multi-sport competition

- Genre: Mind sports competitions
- Years active: 2016–2017
- Organiser: International Mind Sports Association

The IMSA Elite Mind Games (IEMG) are an international multi‑sport competition for elite mind sports disciplines, organised by the International Mind Sports Association (IMSA). The event was created as the successor to the SportAccord World Mind Games, bringing together top players from multiple mind sports to compete in team, pair, and individual events.

== History ==
The IMSA Elite Mind Games feature competitions in several mind sports including bridge, chess, draughts, go, and xiangqi.

The event evolved from the SportAccord World Mind Games, which were hosted under the umbrella of the General Association of International Sports Federations from 2011 to 2014. After the discontinuation of that series, IMSA established the Elite Mind Games to continue the tradition of bringing elite competitors from multiple mind sport disciplines together in a unified international competition.

The first edition of the games was held in February 2016 in Huai'an, China, with participation from over 40 countries and multiple board game disciplines represented.

The second edition was held in December 2017 in Huai'an also.

The IMSA Elite Mind Games showcase the intellectual depth and competitive intensity of mind sports on a global stage, and they contribute to the International Mind Sports Association’s mission to promote mind sport disciplines worldwide and to raise the profile of such competitions alongside traditional athletic events.

== Editions ==
No	Year	Dates	City	Notes	Refs
1	2016	25 February – 3 March	Huai'an, Jiangsu, China	Featuring Bridge, Chess, Draughts, Go and Xiangqi events.	
2	2017	8 – 15 December 2017	Huai'an, Jiangsu, China	Multiple mind sport disciplines invited.	

== See also ==
- International Mind Sports Association
- World Mind Sports Games
- Mind sport
