= Lubabalo Kondlo =

South African draughts player (born 1971)

Lubabalo Nicholas Kondlo (born 21 December 1971) is a player of English draughts (also known as American checkers) from South Africa. He holds the title of grandmaster, and is the former world champion in the GAYP (go as you please) version.

== Career ==
Born in New Brigton, Port Elizabeth, Kondlo started to play draughts at the age of seven years. In 2007, he won the World Qualifier in Las Vegas, United States and became the first draughts grandmaster from Africa.

His match against Ron King in 2008 for the world champion title in the GAYP version was the subject of the documentary King Me. In 2012 he won the silver medal, the gold being won by Alex Moiseyev, in American checkers at the SportAccord World Mind Games in Beijing, China. Kondlo won the 2014 World Qualifying 3-Move Tournament in Clarksville, Indiana, U.S. edging out Sergio Scarpetta on head-to-head tie-breaker. Thanks to this victory, he earned the right to challenge Michele Borghetti in the world championship match in the 3-move version. The match took place in 2015 in Livorno, Italy and was won by Borghetti. In 2018, in Petal, Mississippi, US Kondlo won the world title match in the GAYP version against defending champion Borghetti. Kondlo is the first world draughts champion from Africa. He lost the title on 30 April 2022 to Italian Matteo Bernini.

=== Test matches ===
Although there have not been nearly enough international test matches between countries, Lubabalo has played in:

Year	Played	Country played	Result	Venue
2001	Hugh Devlin	Ireland	lost	Old Edwardian Society, Lower Houghton, Johannesburg
