= Joan Caws =

British draughts player

Personal information
- Nationality: United Kingdom
- Born: Joan Halsey
- Died: November 2, 2017
- Spouse: Ian Caws

Sport
- Sport: English draughts

Achievements and titles
- World finals: 1986 World Championship: 3-Move – Gold

Joan Caws (née Halsey; died November 2, 2017) was a British English draughts player. Caws was a multiple-times English champion, a 1979 British champion and the first Women's World champion (3-Move system, 1986), having successfully defended the title in 1987 and 1989.

== Sports career ==
Joan has been introduced to Endlish draughts by her brother Bill Halsey, who was representing Birmingham and invited her to take part in Open Air Tournament in St Nicholas' Park, Warwick. Joan, who was the only woman in company of 50 men, met there her future husband Ian Caws. In 1969 they played together in the English Open, and two years later this event coincided with their honeymoon.

Joan Caws participated in almost all English and British Open tournaments for the following 42 years, as well as numerous tournaments in the US, Republic of Ireland and Denmark. In July 1974, she played against Sally Jones in the first British Ladies' Championship match. The match ended in a draw, and Jones won the rematch in October with a score of 2–0–1. Caws won the British Ladies' crown later, in 1979, beating Jones with a score of 2–1–0.

In 1986, United Kingdom and Irish Draughts Federation, in partnership with the American Checker Federation, organized the first ever World Women's championship in English draughts. Four players representing England, Ireland and Scotland took part in the tournament that was held in Aberdeen during the British Open, and Caws won the title without losing a single game.

In 1987, Caws successfully defended her world title on her home ground, at Ryde, Isle of Wight, in a match against the American Faye Clardy, winning with a score of 6–5–8. Two years later at Weston-super-Mare, Somerset, she drew the title match against the 13-year-old Irish Women's champion Patricia Breen with the score of 6–6–8, once again retaining the title. Next match between Caws and Breen was played at the same location in 1993, and this time the Irish champion won handily, taking 8 games and losing only 1 with 5 draws.

In 1992, Joan Caws became the first woman ever to play for the England national team in this sport when she took part in the Home Internationals at Morecambe, a four-sided match against Scotland, Wales and the Republic of Ireland. She also represented the Great Britain and Ireland team in the 2004 match against the US national team in Las Vegas, where she obtained a win. In 1995, Caws defeated Cheryl Hall in the first ever English Ladies matchplay championship with the score of 2–1–5, but a year later she lost the British and Irish Ladies matchplay championship to Karen Breen, Patricia's sister. In 1997, at Ryde, Joan won the English Amateur Championship final, defeating her husband Ian. In 2006 In London Caws won a bronze medal at the Go As You Please (GAYP) English Open championship, behind two male rivals Dave Harwood and C. McCarrick.

For 37 years Joan Caws served as the Treasurer of the national draughts federation. In addition, she was trusted with refereeing at Charles Walker's successful attempt at the World simultaneous play record setting in 1994 and at the 2008 World Mind Sports Games. Caws also took active part in the campaign to get draughts in the Olympic program. She died in November 2017, while Ian Caws survived her by less than two years.
