= Aleksandr Moiseyev =

Aleksandr Moiseyev may refer to:

- Aleksandr Moiseyev (basketball), Russian basketball player
- Aleksandr Alekseyevich Moiseyev, officer of the Russian Navy
- Alex Moiseyev, Soviet-born American draughts player
