= Damka (disambiguation) =

Damka is the Israeli name for English draughts or Checkers.

Damka may also refer to:

- Damka, One of the two space dogs surviving the fated prototype Vostok flight 22 Dec 1960
- Damka, Originaire des Hauts de Seine
