= Ronald King (disambiguation) =

Ronald King (1909–1988) was a New Zealand rugby player.

Ronald or Ron King may also refer to:

- Dick King-Smith (Ronald Gordon King-Smith, 1922–2011), English author of children's books
- Ron King (basketball) (born 1951), American basketball player
- Ron King (born 1956), Barbadian chequers player
- Ronald Stacey King (1967–2026), American basketball player
