= Marion Tinsley =

American checkers player (1927–1995)

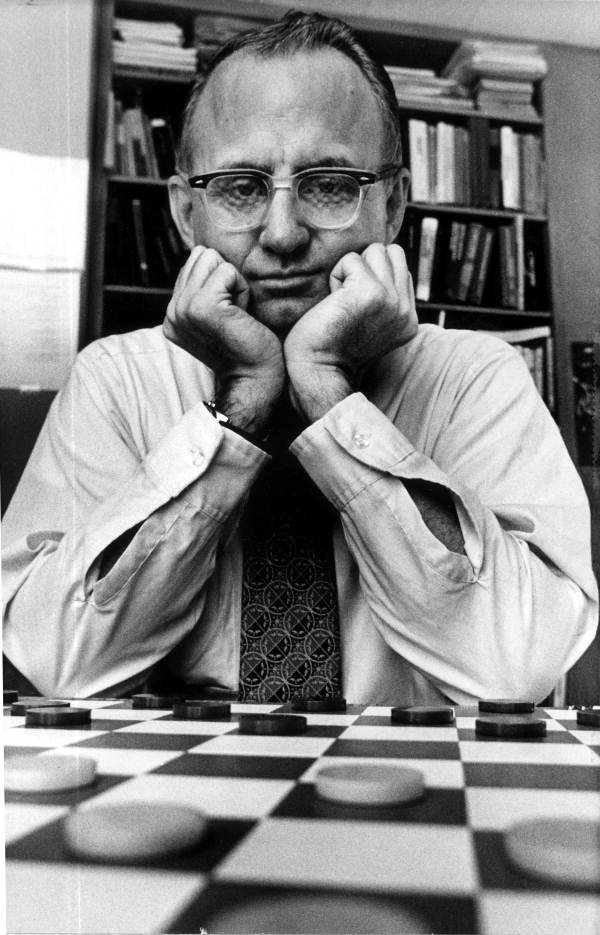
- Tinsley in 1988

Personal information
- Born: Marion Franklin Tinsley; February 3, 1927 Ironton, Ohio, U.S.
- Died: April 3, 1995 (aged 68) Humble, Texas, U.S.

Sport
- Country: United States
- Sport: Checkers

Achievements and titles
- World Champion: 1955–1958; 1975–1991

Marion Franklin Tinsley (February 3, 1927 – April 3, 1995) was an American mathematician and checkers player. He is widely considered the greatest checkers player ever. Tinsley was world champion from 1955–1958 and 1975–1991 and never lost a world championship match. He lost only seven games (two to the Chinook computer program, one in a simultaneous exhibition) from 1950 until his death in 1995. He withdrew from championship play between 1958–1975, relinquishing the title during that time. Derek Oldbury, sometimes considered the second-best player of all time, thought Tinsley was "to checkers what Leonardo da Vinci was to science, what Michelangelo was to art and what Beethoven was to music."

== Early life and education ==
Tinsley was born in Ironton, Ohio, but spent his early life in Greenup County. Tinsley was the son of a school teacher and a farmer who became a sheriff. He had a sister and "felt unloved" by his parents. To gain the affection of his parents, he competed in math and spelling bees as a child. He said of his parents' disapproval: "And as a twig is bent, it grows: As I grew up, I still kept feeling that way."

He skipped four of his first eight grades. He graduated from a Columbus high school at fifteen. Tinsley had a doctorate from Ohio State University in the mathematical discipline of combinatorial analysis. He worked as a professor of mathematics at Florida State University and Florida A&M University. Tinsley once claimed to have spent approximately 10,000 hours studying checkers while in graduate school. Tinsley also served as a lay preacher in the Disciples of Christ church.

== Checkers career ==
After reading a book by Millard Hopper, Tinsley became interested in the game.

Tinsley enlisted in the Navy in 1945 and was stationed at Gulfport, Mississippi, where he won the Southern Louisiana Open. In 1946, he finished second behind William F. Ryan at the Newark National Tourney, losing the finals 2–1–11. Tinsley won four Ohio State Opens (1946, 1947, 1948, 1949), six Cedar Point Tourneys (1946, 1949, 1950, 1951 and 1952), and two Canadian Opens (1949 and 1950).

Tinsley was an eight-time three-move world champion (1954, 1955, 1958, 1979, 1981, 1985, 1987 and 1989) and once in two-move checkers (1952).

His 1951–1995 tournament record, excluding the Chinook games:

Year	Tournament	Result	W–L–D	Year	Tournament	Result	W–L–D
				1975	Florida Open	1st	
1951	Lakeside	1st		1976	Florida Open	1st	
1952	Lakeside	1st		1977	Florida Open	1st	
1952	Canadian Open	1st (tie)		1978	U.S. National Championship	1st	
1952	World Two-Move Championship vs. Newell Banks	Won	3–0–37	1979	World Three-Move Championship vs. Elbert Lowder	Won	15–0–10
1954	U.S. National Championship	1st		1981	World Three-Move Championship vs. Asa Long	Won	3–0–34
1955	World Three-Move Championship vs. Walter Hellman	Won	3–0–35	1982	Southern States Championship	Won	
1956	U.S. National Championship	1st		1982	U.S. National Championship	Won	
1958	British Open	1st		1983	U.S.-Great Britain international match	1st board	
1958	World Three-Move Championship vs. Derek Oldbury	Won	9–1–24	1985	World Three-Move Championship vs. Asa Long	Won	6–1–28
1970	Southern States Championship	1st		1987	World Three-Move Championship vs. Don Lafferty	Won	2–0–36
1970	U.S. National Championship	1st		1989	World Three-Move Championship vs. Paul Davis	Won	10–0–20
1974	Florida Open	1st		1989	U.S.-U.S.S.R. match	1st board	
1974	Lakeside	1st		1990	U.S. National Championship	1st	
1974	Southern States Championship	1st		1994	Mississippi State Championship	1st	
1974	U.S. National Championship	1st		1994	U.S. National Championship	1st	
1975	Lakeside	1st					
1975	Southern States Championship	1st					

== Chinook games ==
Tinsley retired from championship play in 1991. In August 1992, he defeated the Chinook computer program 4–2 (with 33 draws) in a match. Chinook had placed second at the U.S. Nationals in 1990 after Tinsley, which usually qualifies one to compete for the World Championships. However, the American Checkers Federation and the English Draughts Association refused to allow a computer to play for the title. Unable to appeal their decision, Tinsley resigned his title as World Champion and immediately indicated his desire to play against Chinook. The unofficial yet highly publicized match was quickly organized, and Tinsley won.

In one game from their match in 1990, Chinook, playing with white pieces, made a mistake on the tenth move. Tinsley remarked, "You're going to regret that." Chinook resigned after move 36, only 26 moves later. The lead programmer Jonathan Schaeffer looked back into the database and discovered that Tinsley picked the only strategy that could have defeated Chinook from that point and Tinsley was able to see the win 64 moves into the future.

The ACF and the EDA were placed in the awkward position of naming a new world champion, a title which would be worthless as long as Tinsley was alive. The ACF granted Tinsley the title of World Champion Emeritus as a solution.

In August 1994, a second match with Chinook was organized, but Tinsley withdrew after only six games (all draws) for health reasons. Don Lafferty, rated the number two player in the world, replaced Tinsley and fought Chinook to a drawn match at game 20. Tinsley was diagnosed with pancreatic cancer a week after the match, and died seven months later.

== Death ==
Tinsley died in Humble, Texas, on April 3, 1995, at the age of 68. He lived in Conyers, Georgia, but was visiting his sister in Texas when he died of cancer. He was survived by a twin sister, Mary Clark, who lived in Humble, Texas, and by two brothers, Ed, of Sarasota, Fla., and Joe, of Thornville, Ohio. He is buried at Greenlawn Cemetery, Columbus, Ohio, next to his father, Edward H. Tinsley and his mother, Viola Mae Tinsley. His brother, Harold Edward Tinsley is also buried there.

== Television appearances ==
In 1957, Tinsley appeared as a guest challenger on the television game show To Tell the Truth.

== See also ==
- List of draughts players
