= Nemesis (draughts player) =

Computer program that plays draughts

Nemesis is an English draughts program by Murray Cash. Today Nemesis is no longer commercially available; development stopped years ago.

Nemesis was the strongest program in 2002, when it won the British computer championship against Wyllie, a 16-game match ending +5 =11 in favor of Nemesis and the Computer Checkers World Championship played out in Las Vegas.

The World Championship was a tournament featuring Nemesis, Cake and KingsRow. Each program played each of the others 24 times. The final scores were:

1. Nemesis 24.5 points (+1 =47 -0, 1 win against Cake)
2. KingsRow 24 points (+1 =46 -1, 1 win and 1 loss against Cake)
3. Cake 23.5 Points (+1 =45 -2, 1 win against KingsRow, 1 loss each against Nemesis and Kingsrow)

Nemesis used its own 8-piece endgame tablebase.
