= Amangul Berdieva =

Turkmenistani draughts player (born 1987)

Amangul Berdieva (née Durdyeva; born 1987) is an English draughts and international draughts player from Turkmenistan. She is twice women's world champion of English draughts (also known as checkers) in both 3-Move and GAYP (Go As You Please) versions.

Amangul Berdieva won the first women's GAYP World Qualifier tournament in 2005 in Prague, ahead of New Zealander Jan Mortimer. The former was awarded the Women's World GAYP Champion title in 2006 after the latter withdrew from the world title match.

In 2007 she defeated Patricia Breen in Buncrana, Ireland to become the new women's world champion in the 3-Move checkers. Berdieva successfully defended her title in 2011 in Balkanabat, Turkmenistan against her compatriot Hurmagul Toyeva.

At the 2012 World Mind Sports Games Berdieva took 2nd place in English draughts, losing the gold to Ukrainian Nadiya Chyzhevska. Amangul Berdieva did not take part in the World GAYP Championships in 2013, thus forfeiting her world title, which went to Chyzhevska. In 2016, Berdieva regained her world title by coming first in the women's round-robin tournament in Rome.

Berdieva's brother and coach, Maksat Durdyev, was world junior champion in English draughts (3-Move version) from 2010 to 2016. All five of her siblings and her father play the game at a professional level.
