= Sam Gonotsky =

Samuel Gonotsky (born in the Russian Empire, 1902; emigrated to the United States, 1906; died in Hurley Hospital, Detroit, of pleural tuberculosis, April 5, 1929) was a leading American checkers, or English draughts, player in the Two-Move Era (1863–1929). He was an important figure in the then famous Brooklyn Checker Club in the mid 1920s along with Louis Ginsburg and became the American Champion in 1924 when he defeated Alf Jordan in the national tournament. He also matched himself against a supposed automaton machine, Ajeeb, owned by Hattie Elmore which he later directed in matches. He is considered to be possibly the best "crossboard player" and the best US player of the 1920s.
