= Constant Ferdinand Burille =

American chess player

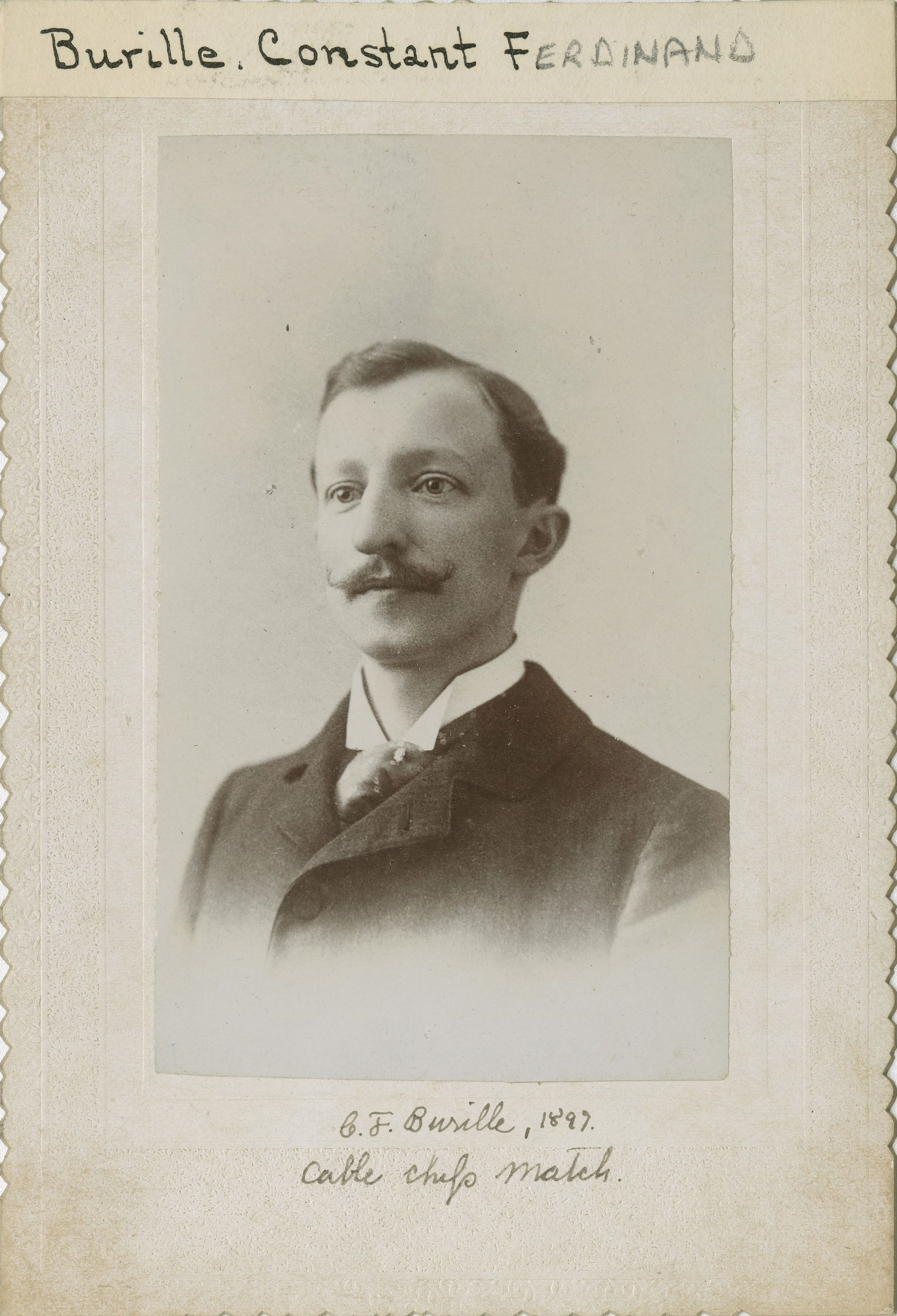
Burille in 1897

Constant Ferdinand Burille (born 30 August 1866 – died October 1914, Boston) was an American chess master.

He was a Bostonian born in Paris (according to another source - born in Boston), Burille was a member of a group of Boston chess players and theoreticians who formed a loose chess association they called the Mandarins of the Yellow Buttons. He took 15th at New York City 1889 (the 6th American Chess Congress won by Mikhail Chigorin and Max Weiss). He beat F.K. Young (13.5–1.5) in a match in 1888, and lost to Harry Nelson Pillsbury (3–7) in 1892 (Burille gave odds of pawn and move). He also played in cable chess matches New York vs. London in 1896 (won a game against Henry Edward Bird) and 1897 (lost a game to Henry Ernest Atkins).

The "Burille variation" is a recognized variation in the Grünfeld defense. Burille was one of the operators of the Ajeeb, a chess-playing "automaton".
