= James Ferrie =

Scottish draughts player

James Ferrie (born 1857; died 1929) was a Scottish checkers or English draughts player of Irish descent. He was the World Checkers/Draughts Champion from 1894 to 1896 and again from 1903 to 1912. He first became champion by defeating James Wyllie in 1894. He is mentioned in the book One Jump Ahead: Computer Perfection at Checkers by Jonathan Schaeffer.
