= 2008 World Mind Sports Games =

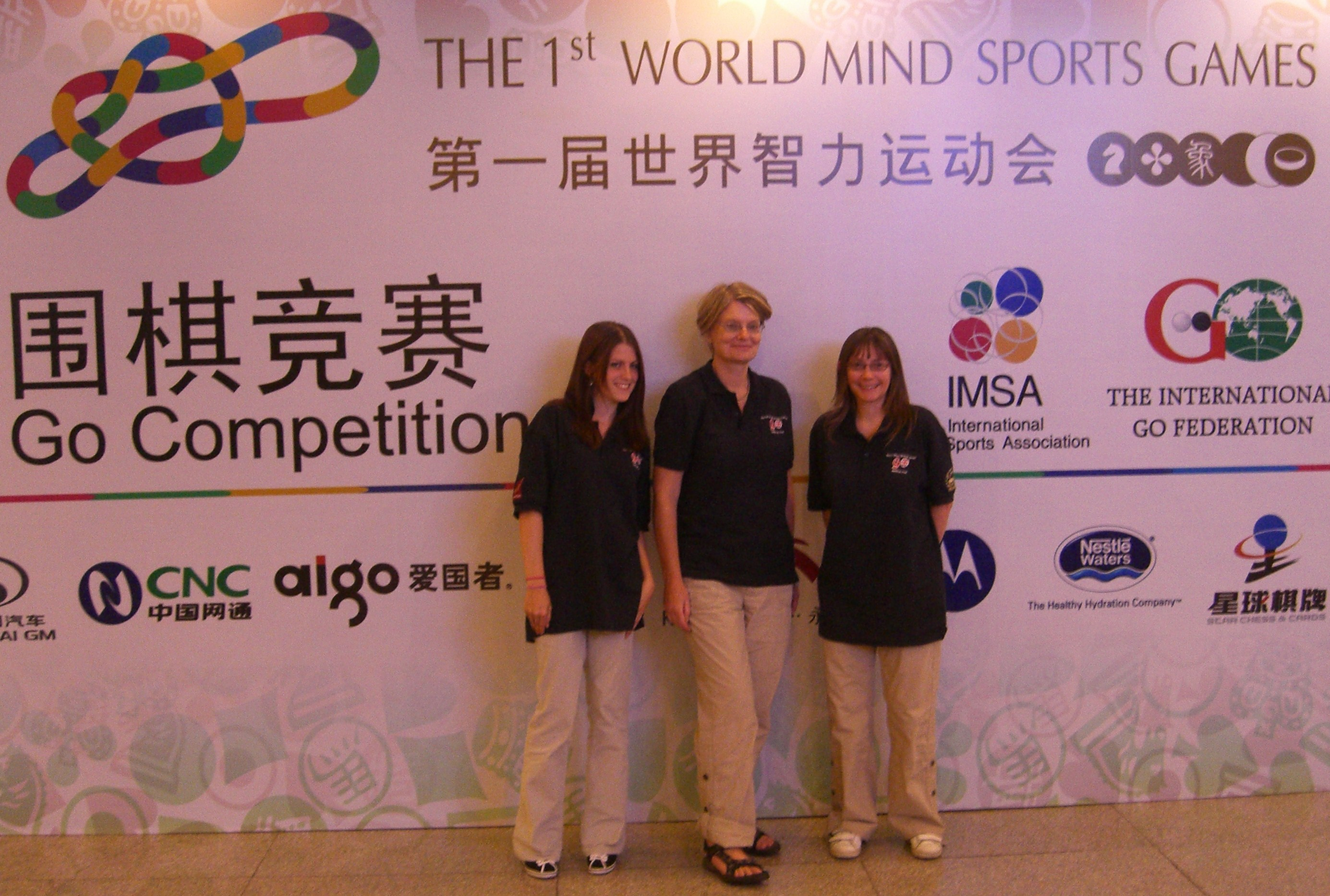
UK players for the Individual Women's Go competition at the first World Mind Sports Games, 2008 in Beijing

The first World Mind Sports Games (WMSG) were held in Beijing, China from October 3 to 18, 2008, about two months after the Olympic Games. They were sponsored and organised by the International Mind Sports Association with the General Administration of Sport of China and the Beijing Municipal Bureau of Sport.

Five mind sports participated in the first Games: bridge, chess, draughts (checkers), go (weiqi), and xiangqi (Chinese chess). Thirty-five gold medals were contested by 2,763 competitors from 143 countries.

According to the World Bridge Federation, it incorporated the World Team Olympiad (1960–2004) and some established youth events in the Games "as the stepping stone on the path of introducing a third kind of Olympic Games (after the 'regular' Olympics and the Paralympics)".

== Events ==
- 35 set of medals :
- Bridge (9)
- Draughts (10)
- Chess (5)
- Go (6)
- Xiangqi (5)

=== Bridge ===
The World Bridge Federation organized eleven events in Beijing that constituted the "World Bridge Games" including nine WMSG medal events. Six were among the established world bridge championships contested in even-number years. (Note: World-level bridge competition comprises some series contested every two years, some every four years, thus in odd-number or even-number years but not both.) The other three were for "youth" under age 28, a one-time compromise. (Note: Youth events are defined by age under 26 (U26) and age under 21 (U21). • A mid-summer notice implies that one-time compromise will be extended to feature U28 youth at least once more in 2012. See the main article for more information. Clarification is anticipated for mid-November.) More than 1400 players participated, about half of all players in the Games. Entries from European Bridge League countries (Note: Several national bridge organizations from the Mediterranean and Western Asia are members of the European Bridge League.) won 22 of the 27 medals, led by Norway with six medals including two gold.

WMSG medalists in bridge
Event	Gold	Silver	Bronze
Open Teams	Italy	England	Norway
Women Teams	England	China	United States
Open Individual	(Norway) Tor Helness	(Norway) Geir Helgemo	(Russia) Andrey Gromov
Women Individual	(Sweden) Catarina Midskog	(France) Anne-Fréderique Lévy	(China) Yan Ru
Youth Individual	(Turkey) Salih Murat Anter	(Romania) Radu Nistor	(Norway) Lars Arthur Johansen
Youth Pairs	(Turkey) Mehmet Remzi Şakirler / Melih Osman Şen	(Israel) Lotan Fisher / Ron Schwartz	(Poland) Joanna Krawczyk / Piotr Tuczyński
under-28 Teams	Norway	Poland	China
under-26 Teams	Denmark	Poland	Norway
under-21 Teams	France	England	China

Two other events were continued by the WBF from its quadrennial "Olympiad" program, as part of its new "World Bridge Games" but separate from the WMSG (non-medal events sharing the facilities). Japan won the third Senior International Cup, for national teams of seniors (age 58+). 'Yeh Bros' from Chinese Taipei won the second Transnational Mixed Teams, for teams of any nationality comprising mixed pairs, one man and one woman.

=== Chess ===
The World Chess Federation organized ten events in Beijing, all of them in rapid or blitz chess.

Event	Gold	Silver	Bronze
Men's Individual Blitz	(Ukraine) Martyn Kravtsiv	(Ukraine) Yuriy Drozdovsky	(Greece) Hristos Banikas
Women's Individual Blitz	(Russia) Alexandra Kosteniuk	(Bulgaria) Antoaneta Stefanova	(China) Hou Yifan
Men's Individual Rapid	(China) Bu Xiangzhi	(Ukraine) Anton Korobov	(Singapore) Zhang Zhong
Women's Individual Rapid	(Bulgaria) Antoaneta Stefanova	(China) Zhao Xue	(China) Huang Qian
Mixed Pairs Blitz	(Ecuador) Carlos Matamoros Franco / Martha Fierro	(India) Krishnan Sasikiran / Tania Sachdev	(Ukraine) Valeriy Aveskulov / Tatjana Vasilevich
Mixed Pairs Rapid	(China) Ni Hua / Hou Yifan	(Vietnam) Đào Thiên Hải / Lê Kiều Thiên Kim	(Iran) Ehsan Ghaem-Maghami / Atousa Pourkashiyan
Men's Teams Blitz	Hungary	China	Ukraine
Women's Teams Blitz	Russia	(China)	Vietnam
Men's Teams Rapid	(China)	Ukraine	Iran
Women's Teams Rapid	(China)	Ukraine	Russia

=== Draughts ===
Under the auspices of the World Draughts Federation 288 players participated in five medal events in Beijing. There was a strong regional showing as twelve of the fifteen medals were won by players from Russia, Latvia, Moldova, and Ukraine.

Event	Gold	Silver	Bronze
International Draughts 100sq (Men)	(Russia) Alexander Georgiev	(Russia) Alexander Getmanski	(Latvia) Guntis Valneris
International Draughts 100sq (Women)	(Latvia) Zoja Golubeva	(Netherlands) Tanja Chub	(Russia) Tamara Tansykkuzhina
Russian Draughts 64sq (Women)	(Ukraine) Viktoriya Motrichko	(Moldova) Elena Miskova	(Moldova) Julia Romanskaia
Brazilian Draughts 64sq (Men)	(Russia) Oleg Dashkov	(Moldova) Ion Dosca	(Ukraine) Sergey Belosheev
Checkers (Mixed)	(United States) Alex Moiseyev	(Barbados) Ron King	(Latvia) Raivis Paegle

=== Go ===
Under the auspices of the International Go Federation 560 players participated in six medal events in Beijing. South Korea won half of the 18 medals and all were swept by competitors from Eastern Asia.

Event	Gold	Silver	Bronze
Men's Individual	(South Korea) Kang Dongyun 7p (Note: The numbers and letters after the players' names refer to their professional or amateur ranks.)	(South Korea) Park Jungsang 9p	(China) Li Zhe 6p
Women's Individual	(China) Song Ronghui 1p	(South Korea) Lee Minjin 5p	(South Korea) Pak Chi-eun 9p
Open	(North Korea) Jo Tae-Won 7d	(South Korea) Ham Youngwoo 7d	(South Korea) Lee Yong Hee 6d
Men's Team	South Korea	(China)	(Japan)
Women's Team	(China)	South Korea	(Japan)
Pair Go	(China) Huang Yizhong 7p ／ Fan Weijing 2p	(Chinese Taipei) Chou Chun-Hsun 9p ／ Hsieh Yi-Min 4p	(South Korea) On So Jin 4p ／ Lee Ha Jin 3p

=== Xiangqi ===
Xiangqi, or "Chinese chess", was the fifth sport to participate in Beijing, where 125 players participated in five events. Although the World Xiangqi Federation was not a member of IMSA at the time, the sport was included in the Beijing games as a traditional Chinese sport with a large number of players, especially in China. The host country won all five gold medals.

Event	Gold	Silver	Bronze
Rapid (Men)	(China) Wang Yang	(China) Jiang Chuan	(Hong Kong) Zhao Ruquan
Individual (Women)	(China) Wang linna	(China) Zhao Guanfang	(Vietnam) Ngô Lan Hương
Individual (Men)	(China) Xu Yinchuan	(China) Hong Zhi	(Malaysia) Look Kongdwa
Team (Women)	(China)	Australia	Vietnam
Team (Men)	(China)	Vietnam	Hong Kong

== Medals ==
Teams from the host country China won one-quarter of the 105 medals, including one-third of the gold.

* Host nation (China)

Rank	Nation	Gold	Silver	Bronze	Total
1	China (CHN)*	12	8	6	26
2	Russia (RUS)	4	1	3	8
3	South Korea (KOR)	2	4	3	9
3	Ukraine (UKR)	2	4	3	9
5	Norway (NOR)	2	1	3	6
6	Turkey (TUR)	2	0	0	2
7	England (ENG)	1	2	0	3
8	Bulgaria (BUL)	1	1	0	2
8	France (FRA)	1	1	0	2
10	Latvia (LAT)	1	0	2	3
11	United States (USA)	1	0	1	2
12	Denmark (DEN)	1	0	0	1
12	Ecuador (ECU)	1	0	0	1
12	Hungary (HUN)	1	0	0	1
12	Italy (ITA)	1	0	0	1
12	North Korea (PRK)	1	0	0	1
12	Sweden (SWE)	1	0	0	1
18	Vietnam (VIE)	0	2	3	5
19	Moldova (MDA)	0	2	1	3
19	Poland (POL)	0	2	1	3
21	Australia (AUS)	0	1	0	1
21	Barbados (BAR)	0	1	0	1
21	Chinese Taipei (TPE)	0	1	0	1
21	India (IND)	0	1	0	1
21	Israel (ISR)	0	1	0	1
21	Netherlands (NED)	0	1	0	1
21	Romania (ROU)	0	1	0	1
28	Hong Kong (HKG)	0	0	2	2
28	Iran (IRN)	0	0	2	2
28	Japan (JPN)	0	0	2	2
31	Greece (GRE)	0	0	1	1
31	Malaysia (MAS)	0	0	1	1
31	Singapore (SIN)	0	0	1	1
Totals (33 entries)		35	35	35	105

== See also ==
- World Mind Sports Games
- International Mind Sports Association
- Mind sport
- Mind Sports Organisation
