= Jack de Haas =

Dutch draughts player (1875–1940)

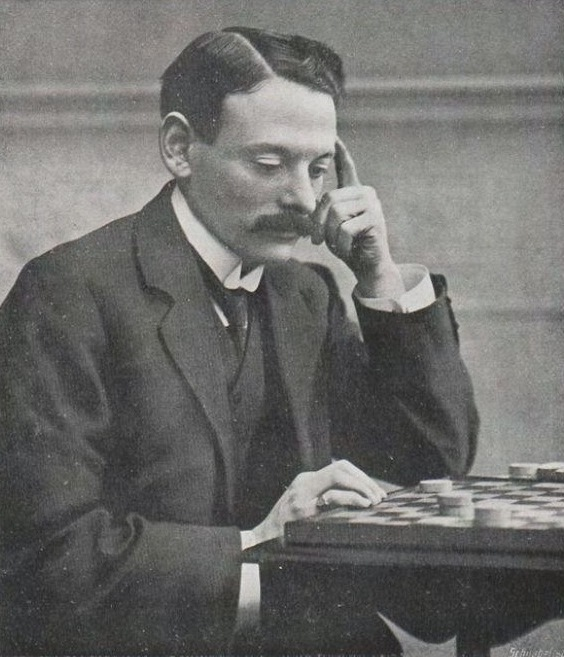
- Born: Jacob Bernard de Haas; 1875; London, England
- Died: 1940 (aged 64–65); Scheveningen, Netherlands
- Known for: Four times Dutch draughts champion

Jacob Bernard (Jack) de Haas (1875–1940) was a Dutch draughts player who played two matches and two tournaments for the world championship on draughts. He became four times Dutch champion in 1908, 1911, 1916, and 1919.

== Life ==
Jack de Haas was born in London but moved to Rotterdam in the Netherlands with his parents when he was two years old. Two years later, in 1879 he moved to Amsterdam. He became a diamond cutter and moved to Brussels around 1920. From 1931 until his death in 1940 he lived in Scheveningen.

== World championships ==
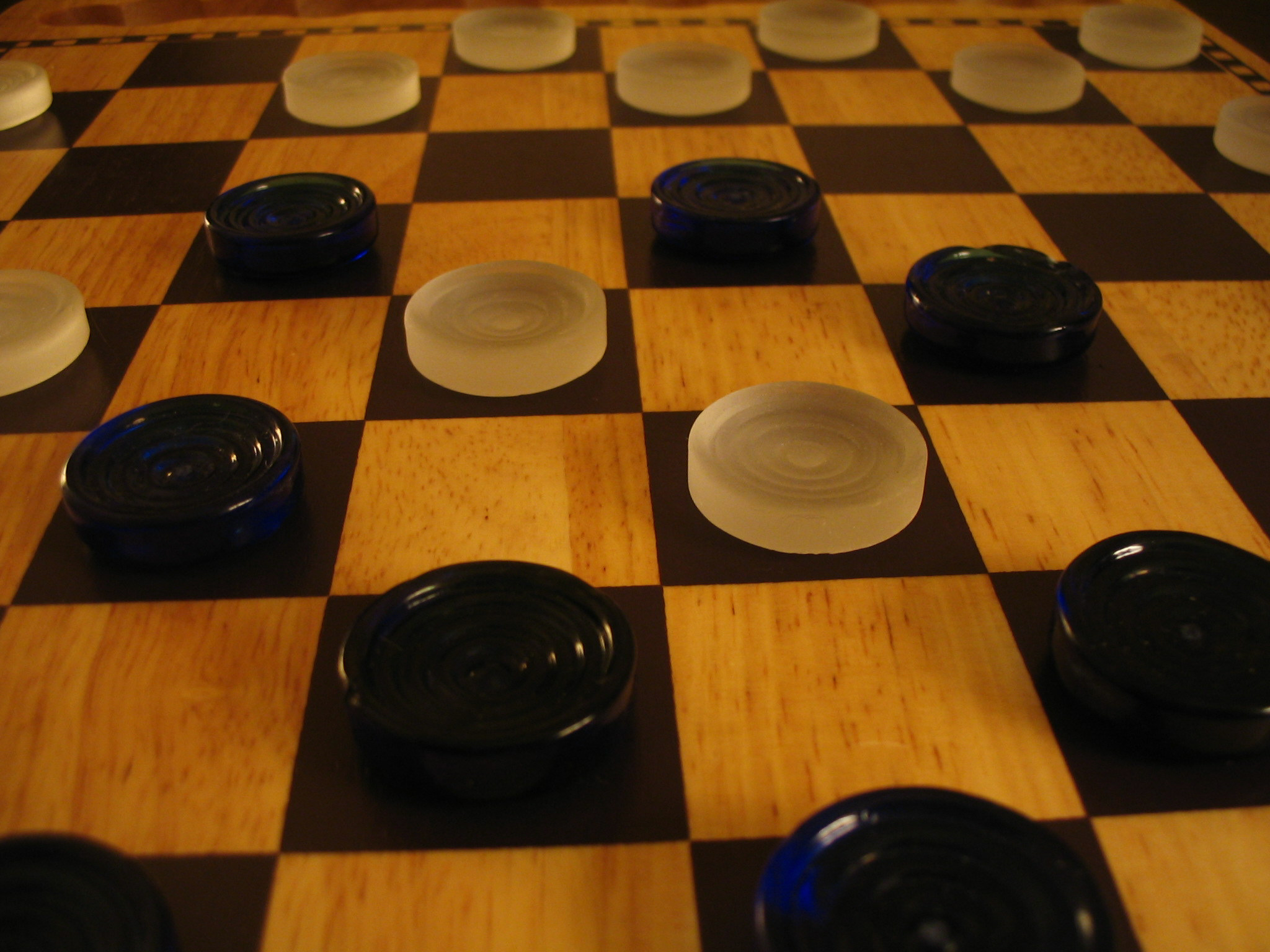
A draught board and pieces

In 1904 and in 1906 or 1907 he played a match against the holding world champion Isidore Weiss. In 1904 the match ended in a 10-10 draw (this meant that Weiss kept his world title), in 1906 or 1907 the match ended in a 19-21 loss for De Haas.

He played the tournament for the world championship in 1909 ending on a third place behind Weiss and Molimard.

At the world championship from 1912 he ended behind Herman Hoogland on the second place, leaving the French world top places 3 to 6.

== Books ==
- Het damspel, theorie en practijk (1908, with Phillip Battefeld)
- Voor het dambord (1912, with Phillip Battefeld)
