= Sergio Scarpetta =

Italian draughts grandmaster (born 1975)

Sergio Scarpetta (born 12 June 1975 in Cerignola) is an Italian grandmaster of English draughts (also known as checkers) and the current world champion in the 3-move version. He was world champion in the GAYP version from 2014 to 2016.

Scarpetta first played in international competitions in 2011. At the 2012 World Mind Sports Games in Lille, France, he won the silver medal in the checkers event, which doubled as the world qualifying tournament for the 3-Move World Championship 2013. In 2014, he won the match for the GAYP World Champion title, held in Manfredonia, against Barbadian Ron King. In December of the same year, Scarpetta won the silver medal in the checkers competition at the SportAccord World Mind Games in Beijing.

In 2015, by finishing first the Irish Open in Strabane, he won the European Cup. In 2016, in Rome, Scarpetta played the GAYP World Title Match against Michele Borghetti losing by 23-25. In 2017, he defeated Borghetti in the 3-move World Title Match in Livorno.

In 2019, he defeated Ron King 33-17 (+8 -1) in the 3-move World Title Match in Bridgetown, Barbados.
