= Ajeeb =

Chess-playing automaton

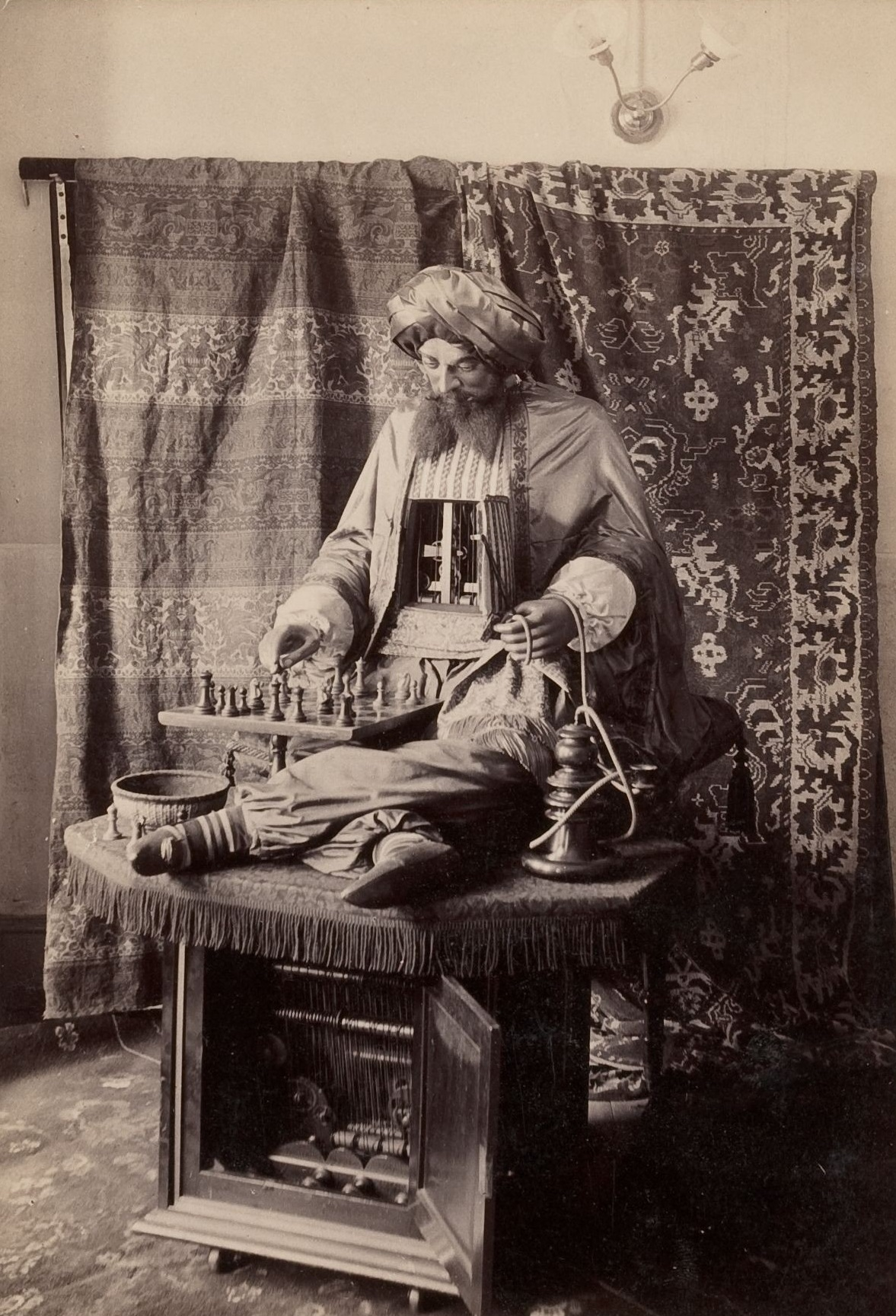
Photo of "Ajeeb the Wonderful", 1886

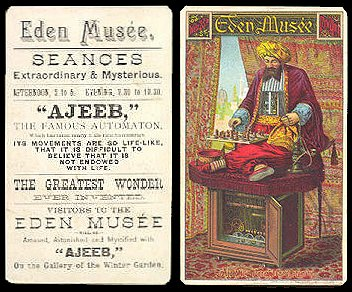
An advertisement for an exhibition of Ajeeb, including an illustration of its appearance. Ajeeb was an imitation of the Turk.

Ajeeb was a chess-playing "automaton", created by Charles Hooper, a cabinet maker. It was first presented at the Royal Polytechnical Institute in 1868. The automaton was a piece of faux mechanical technology presented as entirely automated, while it in actuality concealed a strong human chess player inside in a similar manner to the Mechanical Turk. It drew scores of thousands of spectators to its games, the opponents for which included Harry Houdini, Theodore Roosevelt, and O. Henry.

Ajeeb's name was derived from the Arabic word عجيب (ʿajīb) meaning 'wonderful', 'marvellous', 'mysterious', or 'strange'. Some of the device's operators were Harry Nelson Pillsbury (1898–1904), Albert Beauregard Hodges, Constant Ferdinand Burille, Charles Moehle, and Charles Francis Barker. Moehle, for instance, gained further popularity playing chess in the United States, where the contraption was also exhibited in the Eden Museum in 1885 and Coney Island in 1915. Solomon Lipschuetz was one of Ajeeb's notable opponents during this period. The machine also played checkers, matching against figures such as 1920s American champ Sam Gonotsky, who would also direct the machine under the ownership of Hattie Elmore.

In the history of such devices, it succeeded the Mechanical Turk and preceded Mephisto. In a similar manner to the Turk, Ajeeb was destroyed in a fire at Coney Island in 1929.
