= Tanja Chub =

Dutch draughts player

Tanya or Tanja Chub (Ukrainian: Таня Чуб; born 16 May 1970, Kharkiv) is a Ukrainian-born Dutch draughts player. She won a silver medal for Draughts at the 1st World Mind Sports Games.

Since 1996, she has been playing for the Netherlands, playing for the DDV club (Dordrecht). The champion of this country among women in 1998, 2001, 2005, 2007 and 2008. Participant of the final series of the 2004 Netherlands Men's Championship. In 2010, Tanya Chub announced her retirement from checkers. This was due to a conflict in the national chess federation of the Netherlands after Chub was stripped of coaching support and expelled from the group of Dutch participants at the World Intellectual Games in Beijing. She works in the archives of the Amsterdam Court.
