= World Mind Sports Games =

Multi-sport event

The World Mind Sports Games (WMSG) was a multi-sport event in mind sports created by the International Mind Sports Association (IMSA) as a "stepping stone on the path of introducing a third kind of Olympic Games (after the Summer and the Winter Olympics)".

== History ==
The inaugural 2008 World Mind Sports Games were held in Beijing from October 3 to 18, about two months after the Summer Olympics and one month after the Paralympics. Five mind sports participated in the first Games: bridge, chess, draughts (checkers), go (weiqi), and xiangqi (Chinese chess). Thirty-five gold medals were contested by 2,763 competitors from 143 countries, using the Olympic Village in Beijing.

The sophomore 2012 World Mind Sports Games were held in Lille, France, from August 9 to August 23, 2012, with 30 events. It started during the 2012 Summer Olympics held in London, England, and ended shortly before the 2012 Summer Paralympics. At the closing ceremony of the 2012 games, Rio de Janeiro was announced as hosts for the 2016 event, but that did not happen and no further games have been held.

In April 2026, however, IMSA announced on their website that they had "opened the bidding process" for the World Mind Sports Games 2026, to be held in December.

== Editions ==
Edition	Year	Host city	Country	Dates	Countries	Competitors	Sports	Medal events	Events
1st	2008	Beijing	China	3–18 October 2008	143	2,763	5	35	Bridge, Chess, Draughts, Go, Xiangqi
2nd	2012	Lille	France	9–23 August 2012	95	About 2,000	5	29	Bridge, Chess, Draughts, Go, Xiangqi

The inaugural World Mind Sports Games were held in Beijing, China, from 3 to 18 October 2008. A total of 2,763 competitors from 143 countries took part in 35 medal events across five sports: bridge, chess, draughts, go, and xiangqi. The second edition was held in Lille, France, from 9 to 23 August 2012. Around 2,000 players from 95 countries competed in 29 medal events. The same five mind sports were included, although chess did not feature medal events in 2012.

== Sports ==
At the first two WMSG events, medals were contested in five different mind sports: bridge, chess, draughts (checkers), go (weiqi), and xiangqi (Chinese chess).

The International Federation of Poker (IFP) is an observer member of IMSA, so poker has been mentioned as a possible future sport at the WMSG. The Mahjong International League was accepted as the full member of IMSA in 2017.

WMSG Sports
Number	Sport	Organisation	Web	Join
1	Chess	World Chess Federation		2008
2	Draughts	World Draughts Federation		2008
3	Go	International Go Federation		2008
4	Xiangqi	World Xiangqi Federation		2008
5	Bridge	World Bridge Federation		2008
Later additions
–	Mahjong	Mahjong International League		2017
–	Card game	Federation of Card Games		2018
–	Poker	World Poker Federation		2022

== Continuing competitions ==
More than half of the 2008 participants were bridge players, partly because the World Bridge Federation transferred some important quadrennial competitions to the WMSG, especially the Open and Women flights of its World Team Olympiad. (Note: The third flight, contesting the Senior International Cup, also moved as a non-medal event sharing the same venues.) In 2004 there had been in the main continuing events 72 Open and 43 Women "Olympiad" entries (national teams-of-four with six players on most squads). Under the Minds Sports rubric in Beijing there were 71 and 54 entries, about 700 players. The one-time, similar tournament with a 28 years age limit attracted another 400 players.

== See also ==
- Mind sport
- Mind Sports Olympiad
- SportAccord World Mind Games
- World Team Olympiad
- World Bridge Games
- Computer Olympiad
