= Jannes van der Wal =

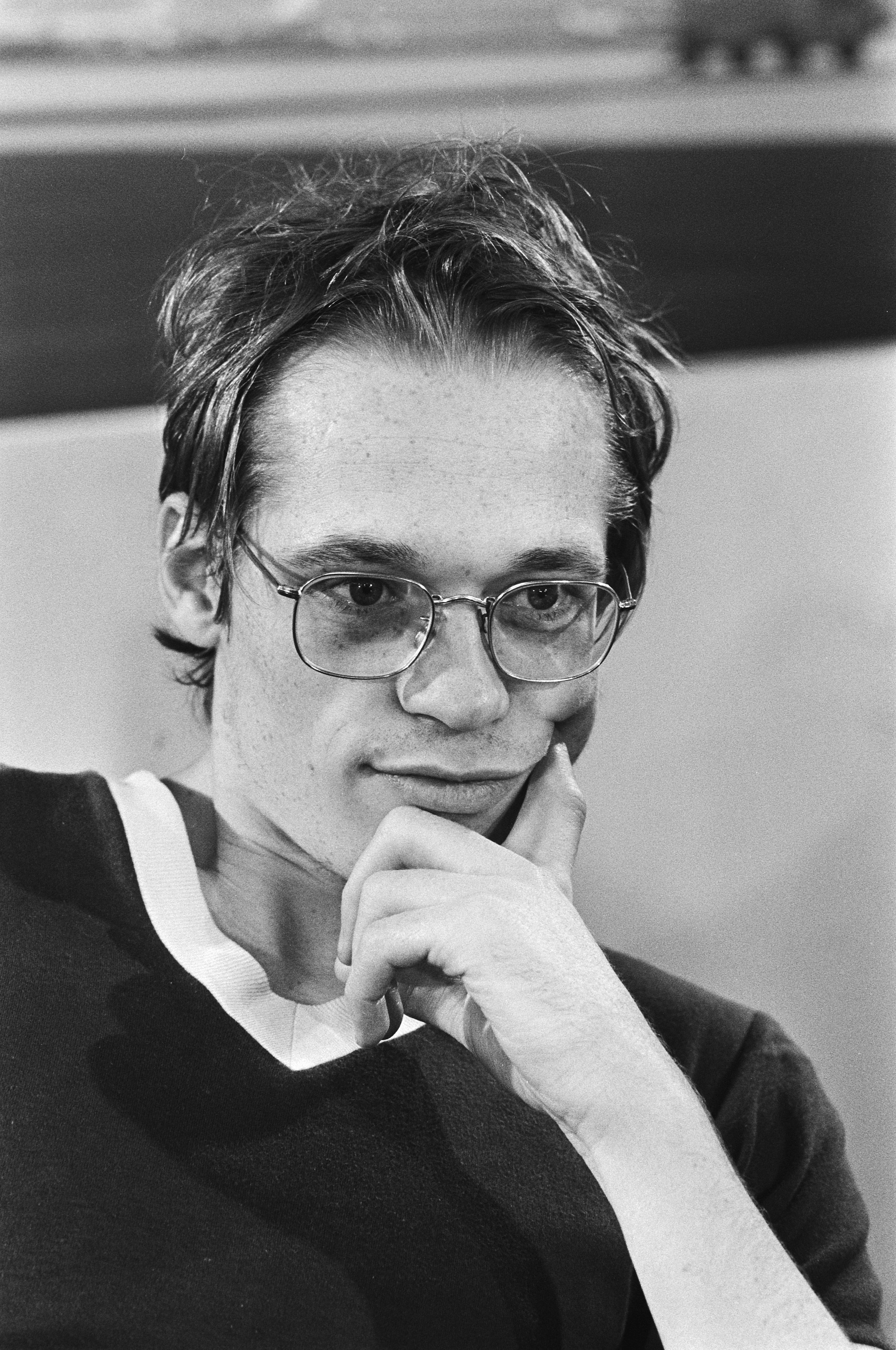
Jannes van der Wal in 1982

Jannes van der Wal (November 12, 1956 in Driezum – September 24, 1996 in Groningen) was a Dutch/Frisian draughts player and world champion in the game. He also played chess at a nearly competitive level.

== Career ==
He became world champion in São Paulo in 1982. After that he garnered attention for his humorous or even eccentric personality. His interviews on Dutch TV were unusual involving a full minute where he did not talk or others where he reacted oddly on being asked how old he was.

After this he became a minor celebrity appearing in a few programs on Dutch television. He was also the subject of a 1999 documentary titled Jannes.

He is believed to have held the record on simultaneous play as he played against 225 players on July 16, 1987. He won against 93% of the 225 opponents with 14 games being draws and 4 losses. Anton van Berkel has since beaten this record.

In 1996 Jannes van der Wal died of leukemia.
