= William F. Ryan =

American checkers player

William F. Ryan (1907–1954), nicknamed the Bronx Comet, was an American checkers player who won national titles in 1939 and 1946. He considered Sam Gonotsky a mentor and friend. Ryan was renowned as the champion of "blindfold checkers" and authored several books on the game. He also worked on a draughts magazine and once played against musician Benny Goodman. In 1954, he died due to a cerebral hemorrhage.
