= Nina Hoekman =

Ukrainian-Dutch draughts player and coach

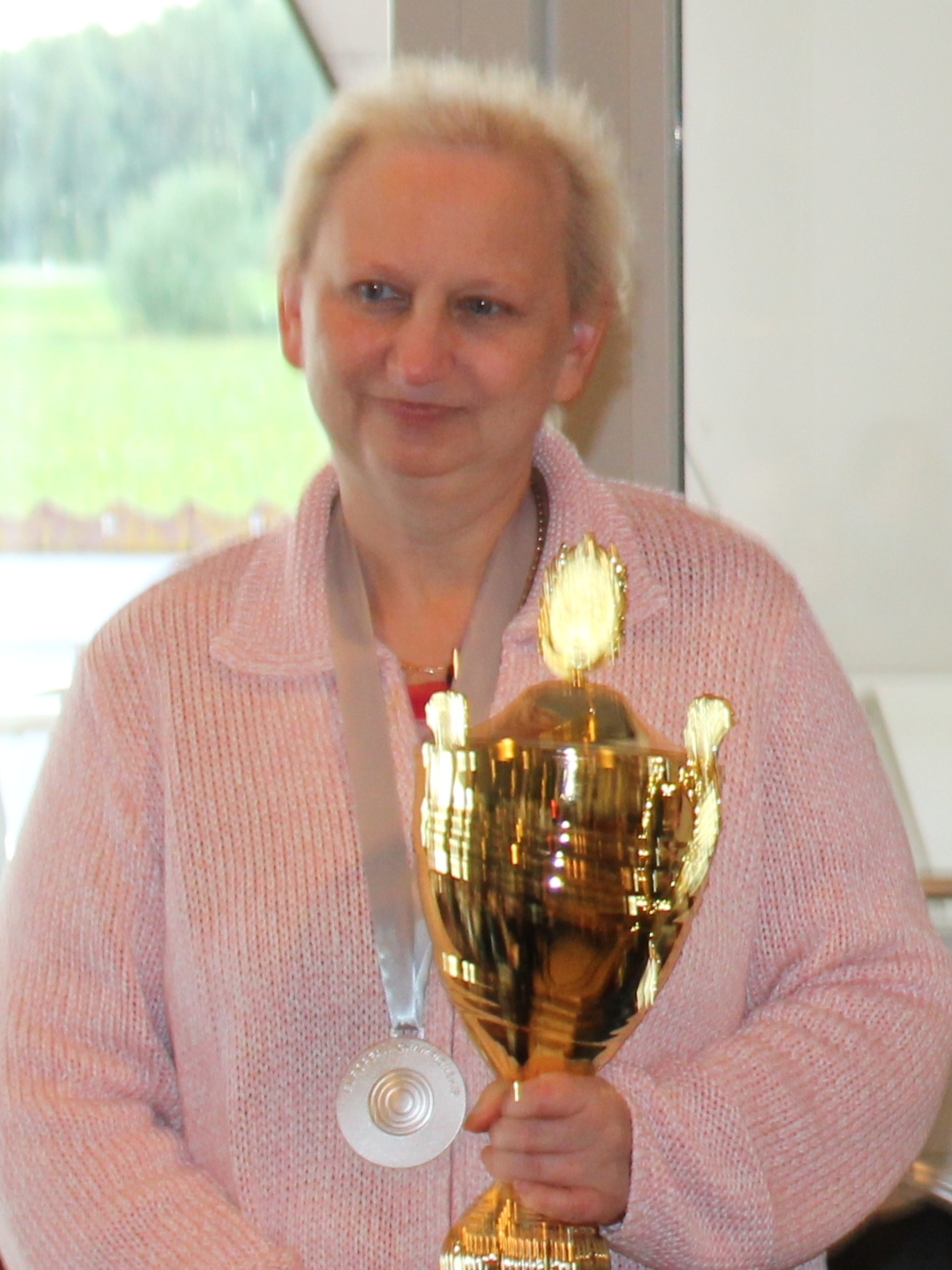
- Born: Nina Georgijevna Jankovskaja; 8 August 1964; Kiev, Ukrainian SSR, Soviet Union
- Died: 26 June 2014 (aged 49); Zutphen, Netherlands
- Occupation(s): Dutch draughts player and coach
- Spouse(s): Henk Hoekman (?-2014, her death)

Nina Hoekman (8 August 1964 – 26 June 2014) was a Ukrainian-Dutch draughts player and coach. At the 2012 World Mind Sports Games she received a silver medal.

== Career ==
Born Nina Georgijivna Jankovska in Kyiv, Hoekman moved to the Netherlands in 1995, and later married Dutch draughts player Henk Hoekman. She became Dutch draughts champion 11 times, winning her last title in March 2014 when she was in a wheelchair and not able to move the pieces herself because of her illness.

== Death ==
She died of breast cancer in Zutphen, aged 49.
