= Michele Borghetti =

Italian draughts grandmaster (born 1973)

Michele Borghetti (born 13 March 1973) is an Italian grandmaster of international draughts, Italian draughts and English draughts (also known as "American checkers" or "straight checkers"). In English draughts he was world champion in both 3-move and GAYP variations.

Borghetti won the 2010 WCDF World Qualifier to earn the right to challenge defending champion Alex Moiseyev in the 2011 3-Move World Title Match. The match took place in Cleveland and was won by Moiseyev. At the 2012 World Mind Sports Games in Lille, Borghetti won the gold medal in the checkers tournament, which was doubled as the World Qualifying Tournament. This victory enabled him to qualify again for the world title match with Moiseyev and on 28 June 2013, Borghetti became the 3-Move Checkers World Champion. In 2015 he successfully defended his world title against Lubabalo Kondlo in Livorno, his native city.

In 2016, in Rome, Borghetti won the GAYP World Title Match against defending champion Sergio Scarpetta. In May 2017, Borghetti won the first 3-Move European Championship. Later in the same year, in September, he lost the 3-move world title match, which took place in Livorno, against Scarpetta. In 2018, he lost the GAYP World Title Match to Lubabalo Kondlo in Petal, Mississippi, United States by a score of 15–25.

He also holds a record for playing "blind simultaneous" games of Italian draughts.
