= International Mind Sports Association =

Association formed by the international federations of several intellectual games

Logo of the International Mind Sports Association

The International Mind Sports Association (IMSA) is an association of the world governing bodies for contract bridge, chess, draughts, eSports, go, xiangqi (Chinese chess), mahjong and card games.

Its members are the World Bridge Federation (WBF), World Chess Federation (FIDE), World Draughts Federation (FMJD), International Go Federation (IGF), World Xiangqi Federation (WXF), Mahjong International League (MIL), Federation of Card Games (FCG), World Poker Federation (WPF) and International Esports Federation (IESF). IMSA was an associate member of the Global Association of International Sports Federations,; it was founded on 19 April 2005 during the GAISF General Assembly. It is based in Lausanne, Switzerland.

== World Mind Sports Games ==
The IMSA formerly organized the World Mind Sport Games, whose first rendition was held in Beijing, China 3–18 October 2008 about two months after the Beijing Olympic Games. The second Games in 2012 would have been formally announced 17 November during the 2011 Mind Sports Festival in London, except that they failed to secure a venue by that time. However a venue was found in Lille in France and the second World Mind Sports Games was held from 9–23 August 2012.

Long term, it hopes to establish "World Mind Sports Games by analogy with Olympics, held in Olympic host cities shortly after Winter or Summer Games, using Olympic Games facilities and volunteers. The constituent World Bridge Federation incorporated several quadrennial world bridge championships in the World Mind Sport Games because it considers the WMSG a "stepping stone on the path of introducing a third kind of Olympic Games (after the Summer and the Winter Olympics)".

== SportAccord World Mind Games ==
Under the auspices of SportAccord, IMSA inaugurated the SportAccord World Mind Games December 2011 in Beijing. For all sports, the meeting was invitational and the events were not world championships. Beside satisfaction of the participating players and federations, the main objectives were to achieve "a worldwide TV coverage, and a large participation to the online tournament linked to the event."

The first four meetings occurring between 2011 and 2014, took place in Beijing during December.

== See also ==
- World Mind Sports Games
- Mind Sports Organisation
