= Robert Stewart (draughts player) =

Robert Stewart (born 1873; died in Scotland on 11 August 1941) was a British champion of English draughts from Scotland. He reportedly lost only two out of 8,000 games. He actually lost more games but was unbeaten for a span of 21 year according to other sources. He also held the title of World Checkers/Draughts Champion from 1922 to 1933.
