= Aygul Idrisova =

Russian draughts player (born 1995)

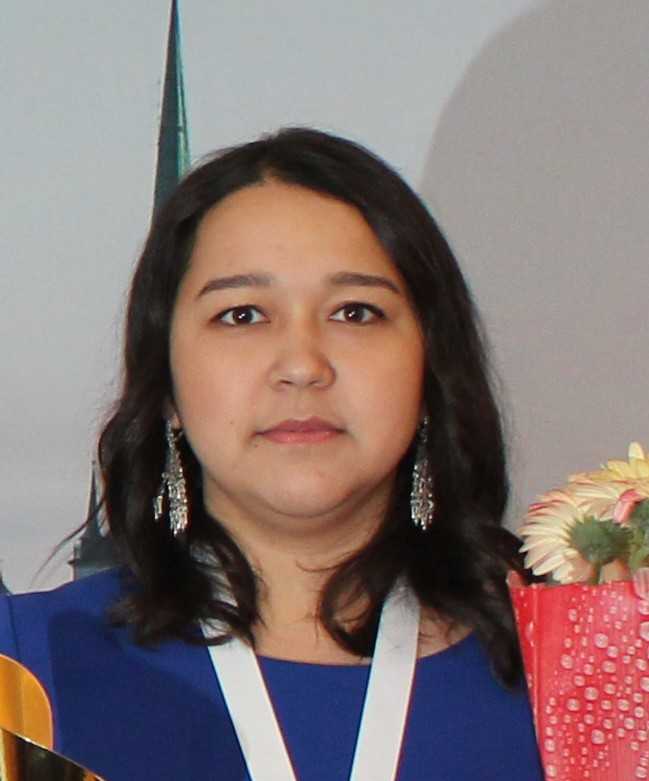

Personal information
- Full name: Айгуль Ильдусовна Идрисова
- Born: July 11, 1995 (age 30) Ishimbay, Russia

Sport
- Country: Russia
- Sport: International draughts
- Rank: FMJD Master (2015); Woman Grandmaster (2015)
- Club: Bashneft
- Coached by: Aleksander Melnikov

Achievements and titles
- Regional finals: EC 1
- Personal best: 2245 (April 2017, rating)

Aygul Ildusovna Idrisova (Bashkir: Айгөл Илдус ҡыҙы Иҙрисова, Russian: Айгуль Ильдусовна Идрисова; born July 11, 1995, Ishimbay, Russia) is an international draughts player. She was third in 2017 World Draughts Championshiphas and won the 2016 European championships, and World and European championships Juniors Girls in 2013 and 2014. International grandmaster (GMIF).

Aygul Idrisova began play draughts at 6 years old. In 2004 she was a participant in the national women's draughts championship.

== Sport achievements ==
=== World Championship ===
- 2013 (19 place in final B)
- 2015 (6 place)
- 2017 (3 place)
- 2019 (2 place)
- 2021 (9 place)

=== European Championship ===
- 2012 (4 place)
- 2014 (6 place)
- 2016 (1 place)
- 2018 (16 place)

=== Russian championship ===
- 2010 (10 place)
- 2011 (3 place)
- 2012 (2 place)
- 2013 (5 place)
- 2014 (8 place)
- 2015 (2 place)
- 2016 (2 place)
- 2018 (3 place)
- 2020 (14 place)
- 2021 (2 place)
