= Li Tchoan King =

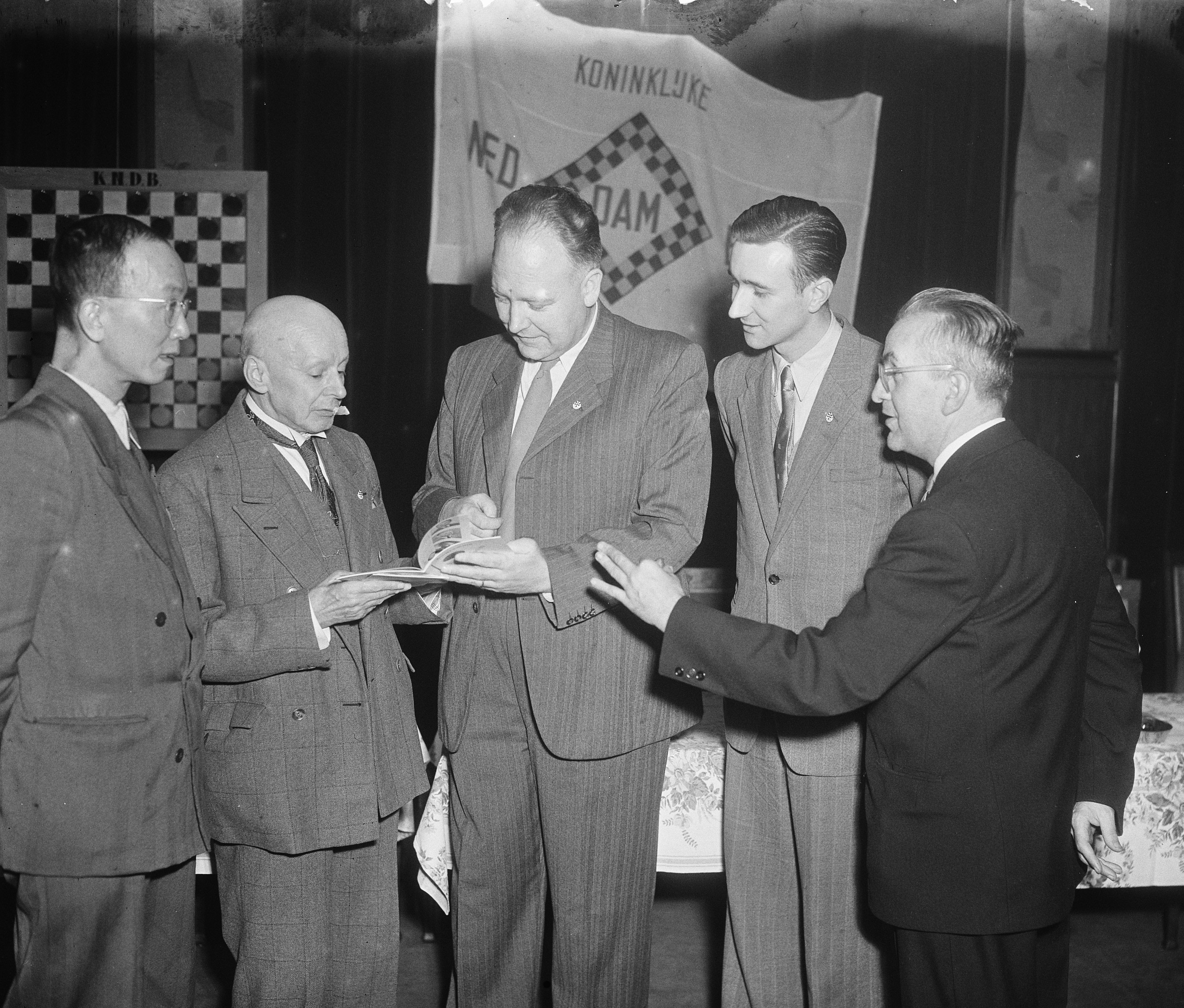
Li Tchoan King (left) in 1952

Li Tchoan King (born in China on 6 May 1904; died in Toulon on 19 August 1971) was a Chinese-born draughts player and former French national champion.
