= Piet Roozenburg =

Dutch draughts grandmaster (1924–2003)

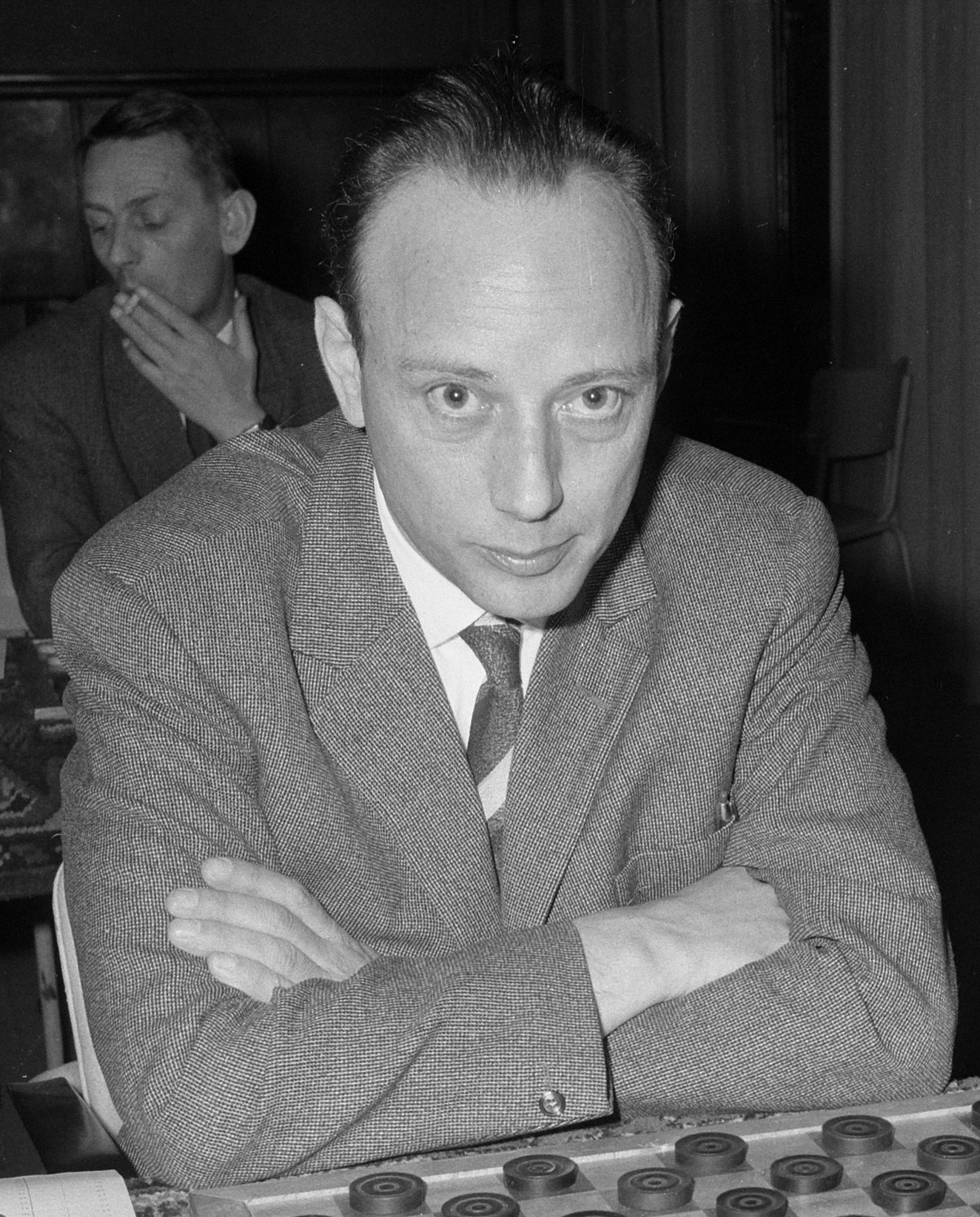
- Piet Roozenburg in 1964

Personal information
- Born: October 24, 1924 Rotterdam, Netherlands
- Died: April 27, 2003 (aged 78) Ochten, Netherlands

Sport
- Country: Netherlands
- Sport: Draughts
- Rank: Grandmaster (1991)

Achievements and titles
- Highest world ranking: No. 66 (July 1995)
- Personal best: 2283 (July 1997, rating)

Piet Roozenburg (24 October 1924 in Rotterdam – 27 April 2003 in Ochten) was a Dutch draughts grandmaster.

He was an important figure in the game, having been the world's draughts champion in 1948, 1951, 1952 and 1954. He created the "Roozenburg system" of play and wrote on the game. He was named Dutch sportsman of the year in 1948.

In his professional life he worked as an economist. His brother Wim was also a successful draughts player.
