= Walter Hellman =

American checkers player

Personal information
- Born: June 15, 1916 Gamla Nordsjö, Sweden
- Died: July 28, 1975 (aged 59)

Sport
- Country: United States
- Sport: Checkers

Achievements and titles
- World Champion: 1948–1955; 1958–1975

Walter F. Hellman (June 15, 1916 – July 28, 1975) was the longest reigning world American checkers champion.

== Background ==
Walter Oskar Fredrik Hellman was born in Gamla Nordsjö, Nordmaling, Sweden. His family moved to Gary, Indiana, United States, in 1927.

== Career ==
Hellman first entered at the age of fifteen and won a Gary City chess tournament. He won his first Indiana State Tournament in 1933 at the age of seventeen. Hellman placed 10th in the masters' level at a young age of 18. Three years later, in the 9th American tournament of 1937 held at Martins Ferry, Ohio, Hellman placed third in the checkers. In 1946, Hellman entered and won the eleventh ACA American tournament held at Nashville, Tennessee, and also the third NCA American tournament played in Indianapolis, Indiana. In 1948, Walter defeated Asa Long to become the new World Checkers Champion.

Hellman held the title the American Checker Federation World Championship from 1948 until 1955 and from 1958 until 1975. Hellman lost only one World Title match, in 1955 to Marion Tinsley. Winning the 8 other occasions in 1948, 1949, 1951, 1953, 1962, 1963, 1965 and 1967. His final appearance in the checkers arena was when Hellman played on the U.S. checkers team in the third International Match between the U.S. and Great Britain at Bournemouth, England.
