= Herman Hoogland =

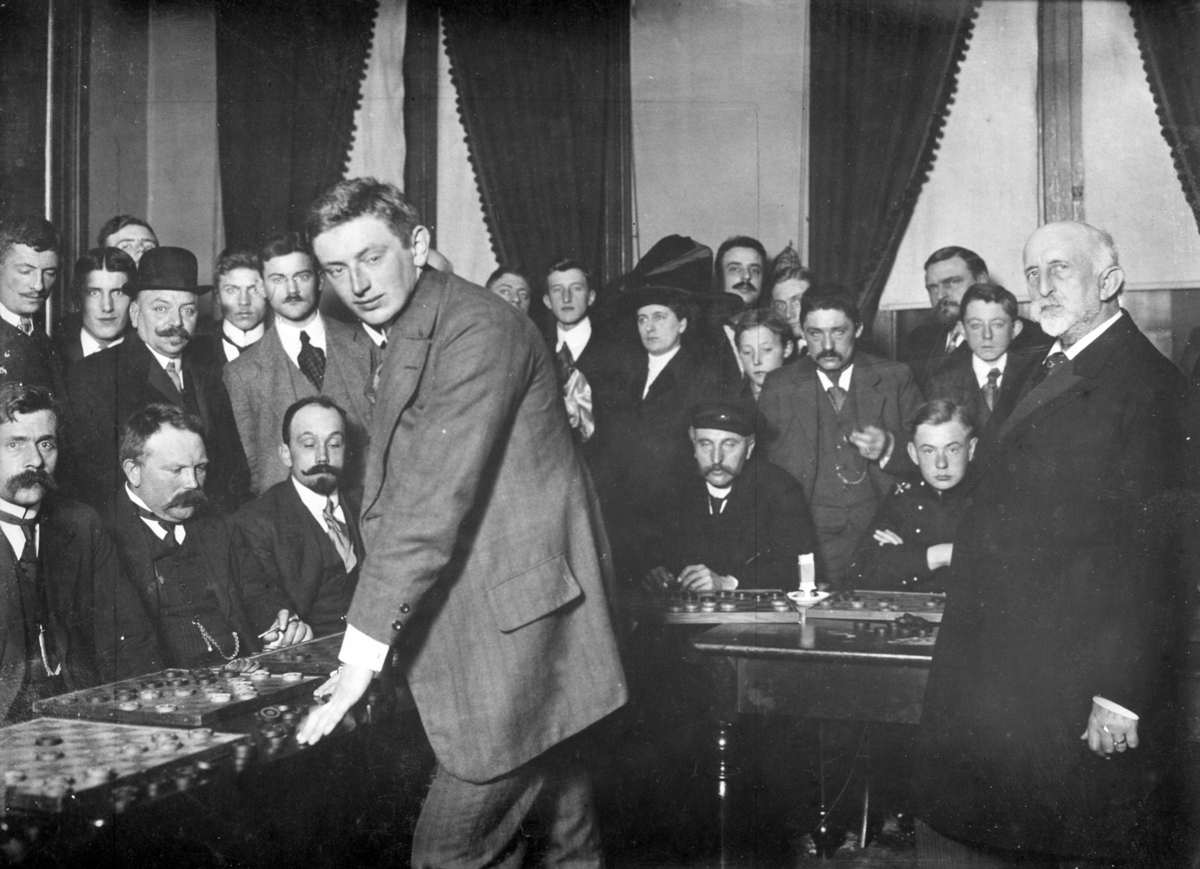
Herman Hoogland (1912).

Herman Hoogland (October 31, 1891 in Utrecht- November 25, 1955 in Utrecht) was the first draughts (also known as "checkers") world-champion from the Netherlands. He dominated the game for over a decade and became a leading student of it. He began playing the game seriously in 1908 at age seventeen. In 1912 he became world champion for the first time. From 1923 onward he became an advocate for a different way of playing the game.
