= Jan Mortimer =

New Zealand draughts player (1952–2015)

Jan Roberta Mortimer (13 December 1949, Balclutha, New Zealand — 26 July 2015, Invercargill, New Zealand) was a draughts or checkers player who entered the game late in life. In 2002 she went to the United States to compete in the U.S. National Championship and won. She later competed at the world level facing Patricia Breen for the women's champion in 2003, then in 2004 won the World Qualifying Tournament for Women. She was married with four children and lived in Otago. In 2011 the World Checkers/Draughts Federation placed her as the highest rated New Zealand player regardless of gender. Jan Mortimer died on 26 July 2015 after an illness.
