= KingsRow =

Computer program that plays checkers

KingsRow is a strong checkers and draughts engine. It was released by Ed Gilbert in 2000.

The checkers engine can be used with the CheckerBoard GUI. It is only available as a DLL on Windows since CheckerBoard is a windows-only program. The engine is available as freeware.

The engine uses neural networks, opening books, and endgame databases.

== History ==
In the only Computer Checkers World Championship, KingsRow took second place behind Nemesis.

KingsRow was stronger than Cake++ in the early years. Cake++ finally caught up with KingsRow and gradually became stronger. It competed a 624-game match against Cake++ on Thanksgiving 2004; Cake++ won 3 to 1, with 620 games ending in a draw. As of 2023, KingsRow is better than Cake. On July 17, 2005, Ed Gilbert completed building a 10-piece endgame database for use with KingsRow. It had a size of 214 GB, but in July 2016 it was reduced to 102 GB using better compression techniques. KingsRow supports WLD (win/loss/draw), DTW (depth to win), and MTC (depth to conversion) endgame databases.

A version for Italian checkers with a nine-piece endgame tablebase is available, too.

== 10x10 version ==
A 10x10 version of KingsRow was started in 2007. In 2009, an eight-piece endgame tablebase was finished. KingsRow won the Unofficial World Championship of Computer Programs in International Draughts 2023. As of 2023, it is considered one of the best 10x10 draughts programs together with Damage, Scan, and Ares.
