= Robert D. Yates =

American draughts player and medical doctor

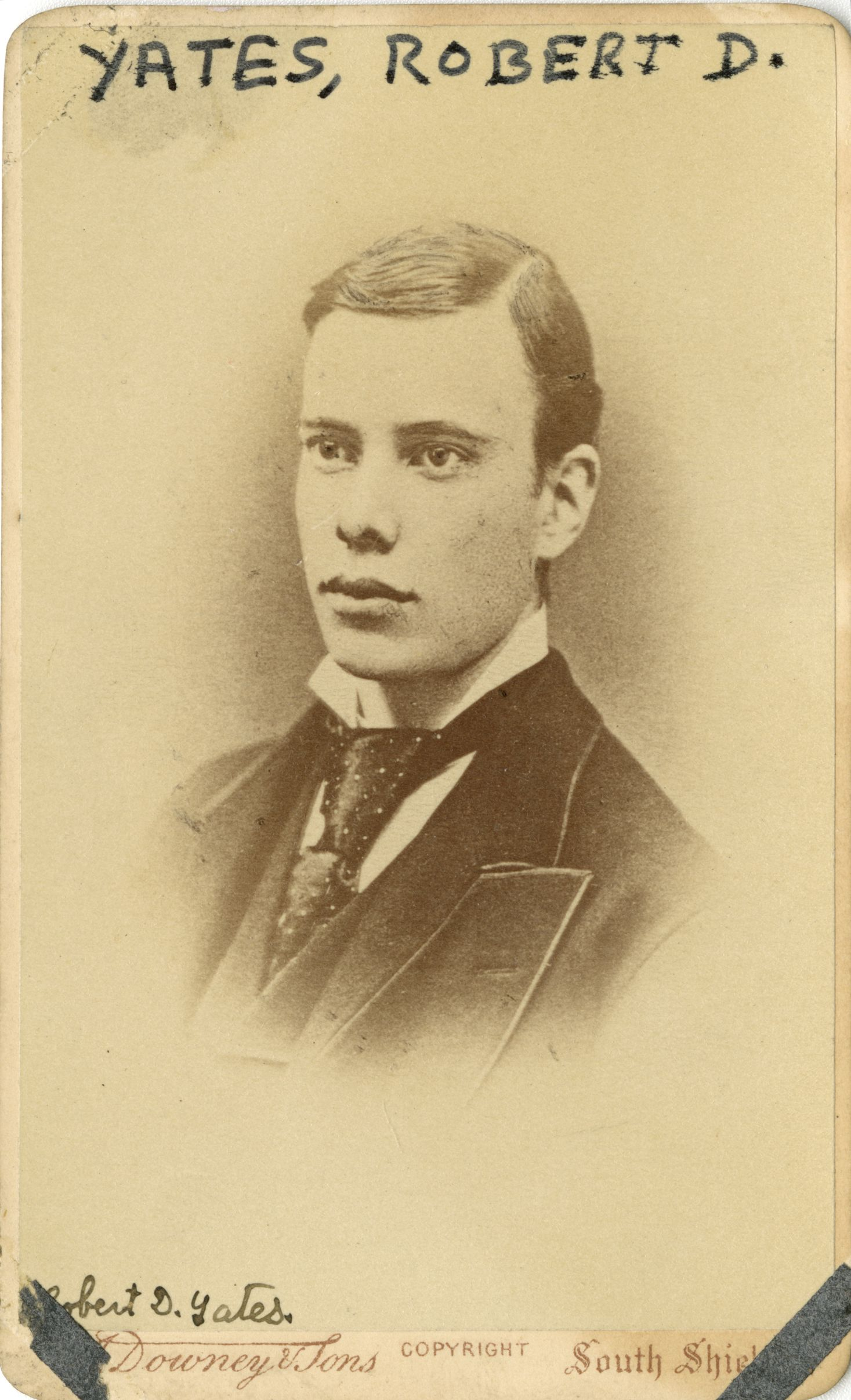
Robert D. Yates

Robert David Yates (December 27, 1857 in Brooklyn; September 19, 1885) was an American draughts champion and medical doctor. He was considered to be prodigious at draughts and was the only American to hold the title of world champion in the 19th century, which he won from James Wyllie in 1876 at age 18. He held the title until 1878 when he retired as world champion and the title reverted to Wyllie. He died of typhus at age 27 while serving as ships physician aboard the steamship Scheidam and was buried at sea.
