= Alex Moiseyev =

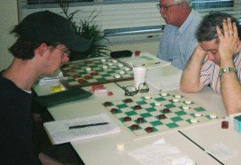
Alex Moiseyev plays white

Alexander Moiseyev (born February 19, 1959) is a Soviet-born American draughts player. He holds the title of Grandmaster in international draughts, Russian draughts and English draughts. In this latter he was world champion in the 3-move variation from 2003 to 2013, winning five world championships, in 2002, 2003, 2005, 2009 and 2011.

== Career ==
Moiseyev began playing Russian draughts at seven and by age fifteen he achieved a Master rating. He had further success in Russian draughts, but switched to international draughts in 1979 or 1980 (sources conflict). In 1991 he left Russia and settled in the US. He won the US title at the international form in 1995 and then switched to English draughts, also known as "American checkers". He went on to win the US National Tournament in 1999.

In 2003 he won the world title in 3-move draughts. In 2008 he won the gold medal at the 1st World Mind Games, held in Beijing, in American checkers. Moiseyev won the gold medal again in American checkers at the 2012 SportAccord World Mind Games in Beijing. In 2013 he lost the 3-Move World Title Match against Michele Borghetti.
