= Patricia Breen (draughts player) =

Irish draughts player

Patricia Breen (born April 23, 1976 in Bennekerry, Carlow, Ireland) is an Irish draughts player and among the leading women in the game. This is primarily in variants other than International draughts. She became Irish Women's Champion at 12. In 2001 she became the first woman player to represent Britain and Ireland in a Senior International Match against the United States and in 2003 won a silver medal at the English Open Draughts Championship, as runner-up to Fred Buckby.

Breen has become the Women's World Champion (3-Move version) in 1993 after winning the match against Joan Caws. Breen successfully defended her world title three times: in 1995 against her younger sister Karena, and in 2003 and 2005 against New Zealander Jan Mortimer. In 2007 she conceded her title in a match against Amangul Durdyeva from Uzbekistan.

It has been claimed Breen is the highest ranked female player ever, but currently she is outranked by Amangul Durdyyeva.

== See also ==
- Amangul Durdyyeva
- Jan Mortimer
- Judit Polgár
