= World Xiangqi Federation =

Chinese chess organization

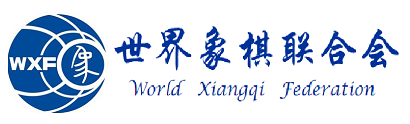
- Formation: July 6, 1993; 32 years ago
- Headquarters: Beijing, China
- Official language: Chinese, English
- President: Timothy Fok
- Website: https://www.wxf-xiangqi.org/

The World Xiangqi Federation is the association of the national Xiangqi federations around the world, and has been a member of the International Mind Sports Association since 2015.

On April 6, 1993 on the occasion of the 3rd World Xiangqi Championship in Beijing, China, the World Xiangqi Federation was founded.

== See also ==
- International Mind Sports Association
- World Xiangqi Championship
- World Mind Games
- Asian Xiangqi Federation
