= Robert Martins =

British draughts player

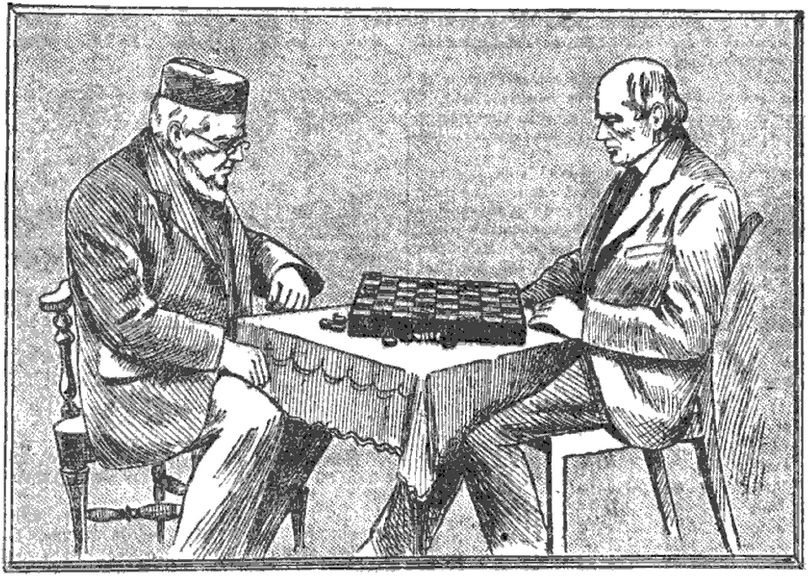
Wyllie and Martins, playing.

Robert Martins (26 February 1822 in Penryn, Cornwall – 1904) was a British draughts player who was World Checkers/Draughts Champion from 1859 to 1864. Although of English/Cornish origin, he spent much of his later life in Scotland. He was a noted rival of James Wyllie. Chambers's Journal physically described him as tall, pale-faced, and long-headed. While in personality they considered him courteous and cautious in expressing opinions on points of the game.
