= Alfred Jordan (draughts player) =

Alfred Jordan (born November 6, 1870, London, England; died May 8, 1926) was an English draughts or checkers player originally from England who was WCDF champion from 1912 to 1917. He also wrote works on checkers and collaborated with Edward Lasker in the preparation of "Chess and Checkers." He remained an active player until nearly the end of his life as he competed in a tournament in Florida in 1925.
