= Andrew Anderson (draughts) =

Andrew Anderson was a Scottish draughts (checkers) player and author who standardized the rules of the game.

Born in Braidwood, South Lanarkshire on 3 May 1799, Anderson's parents were William Anderson from Law village and Mary Selkirk from Waygateshaw. Anderson was baptized at St Luke’s church in Carluke, Scotland on 26 May 1799.

Anderson was employed as a stocking weaver but played draughts as a hobby. By the early 1820s he was considered the best draughts player in Scotland and was regularly challenged by foreign players.

One player, James Wyllie, known as the ‘Herd Laddie’ was Anderson's strongest opponent. Over a period of nine years, the two men played five matches. The first match was played in 1838 in Edinburgh for £10, with Anderson the winner. The second match was held in 1840, again in Edinburgh, for £40 with Anderson the winner. In 1840, the men played a third match in the Clydesdale Hotel, Lanark for £100, with Anderson the winner. The fourth match was held in 1844 in Carluke for £130, with Wyllie the winner. The newspapers attributed Anderson's loss to the death of his wife, but in reality, she had died two years earlier(To say he would not still be grieving is quite wrong). The last match was played in 1847 in the Robin Hood Tavern of Edinburgh for £40, with Anderson the winner. After this last match, Anderson retired from match play. The superiority that Anderson had over Wyllie can clearly be seen in their match games.

After his retirement from draughts, Anderson published several books on the game. Anderson’s guide to the game of draughts was published in Lanark in 1848. A second book The game of draughts simplified was published in 1852, often referred to as the “second edition”. In this book; Anderson established the rules of draughts and standardised the method of recording moves. With the help of John Drummond, the book recorded and fixed the names of all opening moves, with names such as the ‘Old Fourteenth’ and the ‘Maid of the Mill’.

Anderson died 1 March 1861 leaving behind five sons; William, James, John, George and Andrew. He is buried along with his wife in St Luke’s Cemetery, in Carluke. Memorial stones have been found and recorded for his mother and father and at least 3 of his brothers, his has yet to be identified.
