= Ron King =

Barbadian checkers player (born 1956)

Ron "Suki" King (born 1956) is a Barbadian English checkers player from Saint George, Barbados. He has won twelve world championship titles at the game and is considered one of the strongest players of the game. King has been honored by his homeland being named Barbados's Sportsman of the Year in both 1991 and 1992. He has been called the Muhammad Ali of the checkers world for his trash-talking.

In 1998 he made it into Guinness World Records for playing against 385 players simultaneously and beating them all. His 2008 match against South African grandmaster Lubabalo Kondlo is the central subject in the documentary King Me. In 2014 he lost his world title in the GAYP ("go as you please") version to Sergio Scarpetta, as King failed to appear for the final four games(although King was trailing in the match at that point). Scarpetta was leading the match after game 20, and won Games 21 and 22 by Ron's forfeit. The last 2 games did not require playing

== World Championship titles ==
- 3-time world champion (3-move version): 1994, 1996, 1997
- 9-time world champion (GAYP version): 1991, 1992, 1996, 1998, 2000, 2003, 2006, 2006, 2008
