= Newell W. Banks =

American checkers and chess player

Newell Williams Banks (October 10, 1887 – February 17, 1977) was an American checkers and chess player.

Banks played his first game of blindfold checkers at age five years and six months at the Detroit Chess and Checker Club. In 1909, according to Frank Leslie's Weekly, he defeated Hugh Henderson for the national championship. In 1947, at age 60, for 45 consecutive days (4 hours per day) Banks played 1,387 blindfold checker games, winning 1,331 games, drawing 54 and losing only two, while playing six games at a time. He also set a new blindfold speed record playing 62 games in four hours, winning 61 and drawing one at the Convention Hall, Detroit, Michigan.

Banks also played chess and is counted among the few players who have mastered both games. In the Master's Invitational Chess Tournament in Chicago, 1926, Banks defeated Isaac Kashdan and U.S. Chess Champion Frank Marshall, and drew with former champion Jackson Showalter, Samuel Factor, and Oscar Chajes.
