= Asa Long =

Asa Long in 1937, defending his US title

Asa Long (1904 – 1999) was an American checkers player, winner of multiple US Championships, spanning more than sixty years, and a one-time World Champion.

== Checkers champion ==
Asa A. Long was born in Antwerp, Ohio in 1904. As a child he learned the game of checkers when the family moved to Toledo. At 16, Long won the state tournament and at 18 he became the youngest person to ever win the US national championship. In the 1920s, Long began to devoting himself to studying the game in more depth as he had in essence been a remarkable amateur. It is said he clocked 55,000 hours in the study of checkers.

After that, Long would go on to win the world title in 1934. He became less active in the mid-1940s and in 1948 lost to Walter Hellman, a player from Indiana whom he had beaten before. In the 1970s Long's involvement revived and in 1980 he became the oldest person to win the US championship in a surprise victory. This gave him the record as both youngest and oldest national champion. In 1992, Long played his last important match, which was against the Chinook computer. Before that he had mentored Marion Tinsley who would later defeat Long with consistency and be widely deemed the greatest player in the history of the game. Asa Long was a grandmaster for 70 years in total.

== Personal life ==
In 1929, Long married Isabel who died in 1979. He had two surviving sons with her and also had grandchildren. Long credited his inner calm to his Christian faith. He lived in Ohio for most of his life.
