= SportAccord World Mind Games =

Annual invitational sporting meet

The International Mind Sports Association (IMSA) inaugurated the SportAccord World Mind Games December 2011 in Beijing. For all sports, the meet was invitational and the events were not world championships. Beside satisfaction of the participating players and federations, the main objectives were to achieve "a worldwide TV coverage, and a large participation to the online tournament linked to the event."

The first four meets, 2011 to 2014, were all held in Beijing during December.

== Events ==
Year	No.	City	Dates	Source
2011	1	Beijing, China	8–16 December	
2012	2	Beijing, China	12–19 December	
2013	3	Beijing, China	12–18 December	
2014	4	Beijing, China	11–17 December	

== Results ==
=== Bridge ===
There were six medal events at bridge, three each for men and women. IMSA invited 24 players, six each from four countries, to compete in three small tournaments as four national teams, twelve pairs, and 24 individuals. The women were from England (competing as "Great Britain"), France, China, and the United States ("USA"); the men from Netherlands, Norway, China, and the U.S.

China and the United States (USA) have participated in every one of the 4-country men's and women's fields. The other participants have been members of the European Olympic Committee, including England in every women's field (under the name "Great Britain" in 2011 and 2012).

Five players participated in all the first four meets: Shi Haojun of China men; Fiona Brown, Heather Dhondy, and Nevena Senior of England women; and Lynn Deas of USA women.

Men					Women
2011	2012	2013	2014		2011	2012	2013	2014
x	x	x	x	China	x	x	x	x	host of the first 4 renditions
				England	W	W	x	x	as Great Britain in 2011, 2012
				France	V	x
			x	Israel			x
		x	x	Monaco
B	x			Netherlands				x
x				Norway
		x		Poland
	W			Sweden
x	x	x	x	USA	x	x	V	x
				not represented:
(W)		(B)		Italy

Several reigning open and women teams world champion countries have participated, not always with the champion teams intact. (As usual, all players on the relevant open world champion teams were men.)

B - world champions, Bermuda Bowl 2011 (Italy won in 2013)
V - world champions, Venice Cup 2011, 2013
W - world champions, World Mind Sports Games 2008, 2012 (Italy won the open in 2008)

- Source

== See also ==
- World Mind Sports Games
