= James Wyllie =

Scottish draughts player

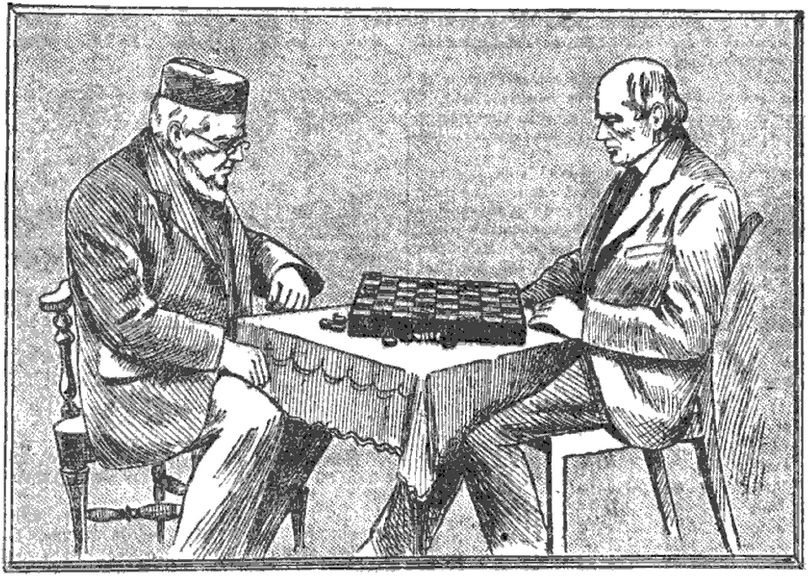
Wyllie and Martins, playing.

James Wyllie (8 July 1818 – 5 April 1899) was a Scottish draughts player who is important to the history of the game. He is often nicknamed "The Herd Laddie". For many years the date of his birth was uncertain. The day was thought to have been 6 July and 1818 and 1820 were both candidates for the year. However, in 2005 research at the National Archives confirmed the correct date.
