= Bushuev =

Bushuev or Bushuyev (Russian: Бушуев) is a Russian masculine surname originating from the verb bushit (make noise); its feminine counterpart is Bushueva or Bushuyeva. It may refer to the following notable people:

- Denis Bushuev (born 1982), Russian football player and manager
- Ekaterina Bushueva (1962–2011), Russian draughts player
- Mikhail Bushuev (1876–1936), Soviet breeding scientist who developed the Bushuyev cattle
- Nikolai Bushuev (born 1985), Russian ice hockey forward
- Viktor Bushuev (1933–2003), Russian weightlifter
