= Vitalia (name) =

Vitalia is a female given name. Notable people with the name include:

- Vitalia Diatchenko (born 1990), Russian tennis player
- Vitalia Doumesh (born 1965), Dutch draughts player
- Vitalia Pavlicenco (born 1953), Moldovan politician
- Vitalia Viktorovna Reshetnyak (1925–2015), Soviet protozoologist and marine biologist

== See also ==
- Vitalia, extinct reptile
- Vitaliia Koroleva
