= 2025 Women's World Draughts Championship =

International draughts tournament

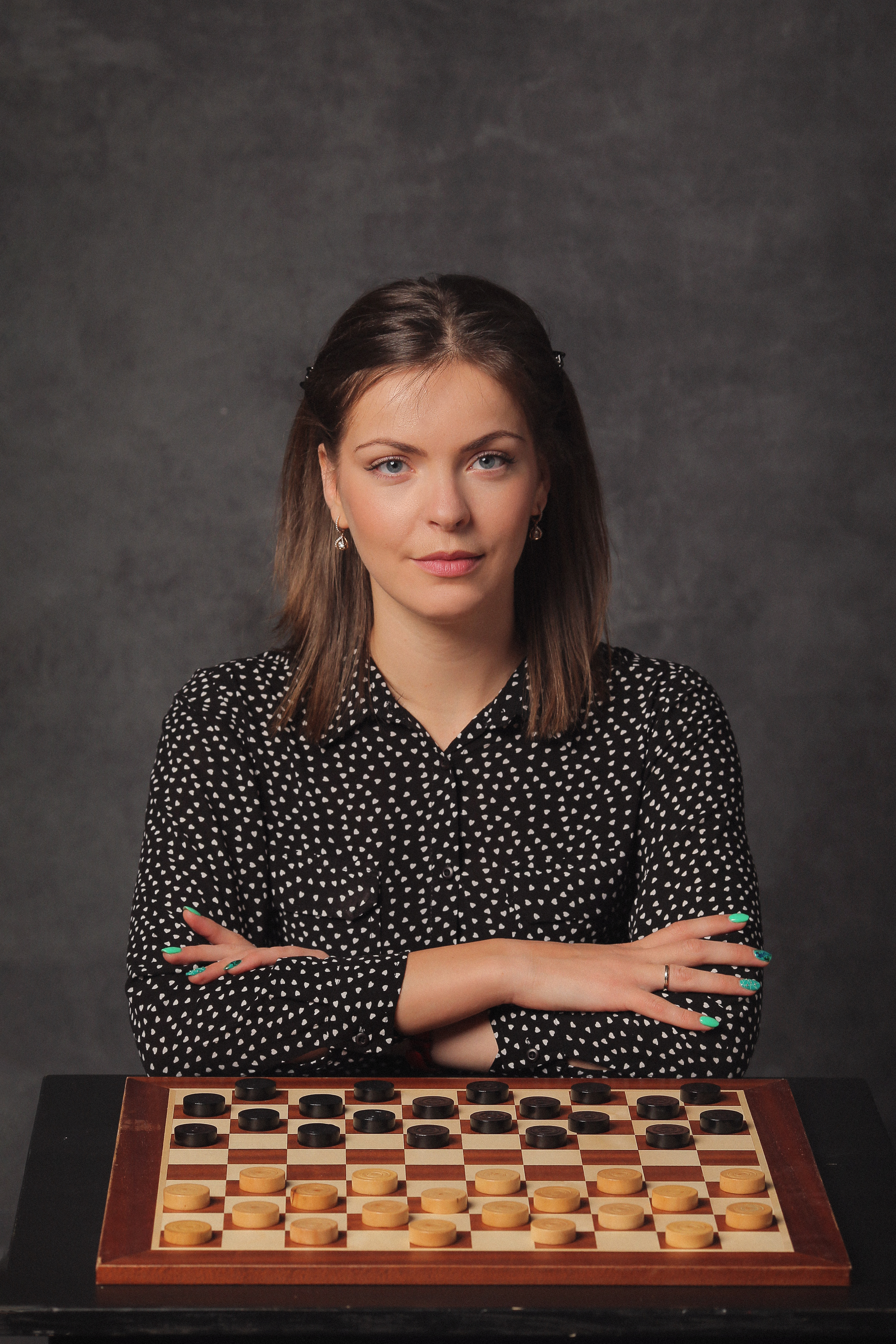
- 2025 Women's World Draughts Champion Viktoriya Motrichko

Tournament information
- Location: Couva, Trinidad and Tobago
- Dates: 27 September–5 October
- Administrator: FMJD
- Tournament format: Swiss system
- Venue: Couva Point Lisas Chamber of Commerce

Final positions
- Champion: Viktoriya Motrichko
- Runner-up: Saiya Gangsuhe

The 2025 Women's World Draughts Championship in international draughts was held from 27 September to 5 October, 2025, at the Couva Point Lisas Chamber of Commerce in Couva, Trinidad and Tobago. It was held under the auspices of the International Draughts Federation (FMJD). The championship was played as a 9-round Swiss-system tournament with 18 players. The total prize money for the tournament was 20,000 euros.

== Rules and regulations ==
The games were played with the official FMJD classical time control: 90 minutes for 45 moves, followed by 30 minutes for the rest of the game plus a 30-second increment per move. FMJD regulations prohibited players from agreeing to a draw before each had completed 40 moves; doing so required the referee to award both players 0 points.

The final rankings were determined by total points. If two or more players finished with the same score, Solkoff coefficients were used as tiebreakers. Ties were broken in the following order: the truncated Solkoff coefficient (SSolk), the sum of Solkoff coefficients (Solk+), the Solkoff–Balyakin coefficient (BSolk), and the full truncated Solkoff coefficient.

== Participants ==
Number	Name	Country	Title	Rating	Qualification path
1	Viktoriya Motrichko	Ukraine	GMIF	2282	1st place in Women's World Championship 2023
2	Darya Tkachenko	Netherlands	GMIF	2260	2nd place in Women's World Championship 2023
3	Natalia Sadowska	Poland	GMIF	2217	3rd place in Women's Draughts European Championship
4	Marta Bankowska	Poland	GMIF	2185	4th place in Women's Draughts European Championship
5	Olga Baltazhy	Ukraine	GMIF	2124	12th place in Women's Draughts European Championship
6	Olena Korotka	Ukraine	MIF	2118	3rd place in Women's World Championship 2023
7	Alise Misane	Latvia	MFF	2115	8th place in Women's Draughts European Championship
8	Saiya Gangsuhe	China	MIF	2107	4th place in Women's Draughts Asian Championship
9	Yulia Makarenkova	Ukraine	MIF	2103	6th place in Women's Draughts European Championship
10	Munkhjin Baatarkhuu	Mongolia	GMIF	2097	1st place in Women's Draughts Asian Championship
11	Tsatsral Tsogtgerel	Mongolia	CMFF	2076	Global reserve list
12	Malvine Misane	Latvia	MFF	2068	10th place in Women's Draughts European Championship
13	Anujin Baatarkhuu	Mongolia	MFF	2011	3rd place in Women's Draughts Asian Championship
14	Carla Assuncao Calasans	Brazil		1937	1st place in Women's Panamerican Championship
15	Galina Petukhova	United States	CMFF	1896	2nd place in Women's Panamerican Championship
16	Sofia Pandolfo	Italy		1867	13th place in Women's Draughts European Championship
17	Candida Joaquin	Dominican Republic		1725	Sponsor place
18	Elena Panchoo	Trinidad and Tobago			Organization place

GMIF — women's international grandmaster

MIF — women's international master

MFF — women's master FMJD

CMFF — candidate for women's master FMJD

=== Replacements ===
Participant	Replacement
(Netherlands) Yulia Bintsarovska (5th place in Women's Draughts European Championship)	(Ukraine) Olga Baltazhy (12th place in Women's Draughts European Championship)
(Netherlands) Lisa Scholtens (7th place in Women's Draughts European Championship)	(Italy) Sofia Pandolfo (13th place in Women's Draughts European Championship)

- You Zhang from China (2nd place in Women's Draughts Asian Championship) and Cindy Joelle Ayana from Cameroon (1st place in African Qualification for WC-2025) received the right to participate in the championship but did not participate.

== Final standings ==
Place	Name	Country	Title	Rating	1	2	3	4	5	6	7	8	9	Points	Wins	Draws	Losses	(SSolk)	(Solk+)
1	Viktoriya Motrichko	Ukraine	GMIF	2282	=8	=12	=6	+5	=7	+2	=3	+9	=4	12	3	6	0	88	757
2	Saiya Gangsuhe	China	MIF	2107	+18	+11	+10	=3	=9	-1	=4	=5	+13	12	4	4	1	84	787
3	Yulia Makarenkova	Ukraine	MIF	2103	+17	=10	+5	=2	=4	=9	=1	=7	=11	11	2	7	0	87	782
4	Natalia Sadowska	Poland	GMIF	2217	=13	=9	+14	=7	=3	+12	=1	=6	=1	11	2	7	0	86	755
5	Darya Tkachenko	Netherlands	GMIF	2260	=12	+8	-3	-1	+15	+16	=6	=2	+14	11	4	3	2	81	704
6	Marta Bankowska	Poland	GMIF	2185	=9	=14	=1	=10	+16	=7	=5	=4	+18	11	2	7	0	78	761
7	Alise Misane	Latvia	MFF	2115	=14	=13	+15	=4	=1	=6	=9	=3	+16	11	2	7	0	78	744
8	Munkhjin Baatarkhuu	Mongolia	GMIF	2097	=1	-5	+16	-11	+18	=10	=13	+17	+15	11	4	3	2	68	718
9	Anujin Baatarkhuu	Mongolia	MFF	2011	=6	=4	+12	+13	=2	=3	=7	-1	=10	10	2	6	1	88	766
10	Olena Korotka	Ukraine	MIF	2118	+15	=3	-2	=6	=11	=8	+17	=12	=9	10	2	6	1	82	716
11	Olga Baltazhy	Ukraine	GMIF	2124	+16	-2	-13	+8	=10	+14	-12	+15	=3	10	4	2	3	77	691
12	Tsatsral Tsogtgerel	Mongolia	CMFF	2076	=5	=1	-9	+18	+13	-4	+11	=10	=17	10	3	4	2	76	768
13	Malvine Misane	Latvia	MFF	2068	=4	=7	+11	-9	-12	+17	=8	+18	-2	9	3	3	3	78	732
14	Sofia Pandolfo	Italy		1867	=7	=6	-4	=15	+17	-11	+18	-16	-5	7	2	3	4	70	712
15	Galina Petukhova	United States	CMFF	1896	-10	+17	-7	=14	-5	+18	+16	-11	-8	7	3	1	5	69	695
16	Carla Assuncao Calasans	Brazil		1937	-11	+18	-8	+17	-6	-5	-15	+14	-7	6	3	0	6	71	686
17	Elena Panchoo	Trinidad and Tobago			-3	-15	+18	-16	-14	-13	-10	-8	=12	3	1	1	7	71	683
18	Candida Joaquin	Dominican Republic		1725	-2	-16	-17	-12	-8	-15	-14	-13	-6	0	0	0	9	73	665

== Results by round ==
=== Round 1 ===
(Ukraine) Viktoriya Motrichko – (Mongolia) Munkhjin Baatarkhuu 1–1

(Netherlands) Darya Tkachenko – (Mongolia) Tsatsral Tsogtgerel 1–1

(Poland) Natalia Sadowska – (Latvia) Malvine Misane 1–1

(Poland) Marta Bankowska – (Mongolia) Anujin Baatarkhuu 1–1

(Ukraine) Olga Baltazhy – (Brazil) Carla Assuncao Calasans 2–0

(Ukraine) Olena Korotka – (United States) Galina Petukhova 2–0

(Latvia) Alise Misane – (Italy) Sofia Pandolfo 1–1

(China) Saiya Gangsuhe – (Trinidad and Tobago) Candida Joaquin 2–0

(Ukraine) Yulia Makarenkova – (Dominican Republic) Elena Panchoo 2–0

=== Round 2 ===
(China) Saiya Gangsuhe – (Ukraine) Olga Baltazhy 2–0

(Ukraine) Olena Korotka – (Ukraine) Yulia Makarenkova 1–1

(Mongolia) Tsatsral Tsogtgerel – (Ukraine) Viktoriya Motrichko 1–1

(Netherlands) Darya Tkachenko – (Mongolia) Munkhjin Baatarkhuu 2–0

(Mongolia) Anujin Baatarkhuu – (Poland) Natalia Sadowska 1–1

(Poland) Marta Bankowska – (Italy) Sofia Pandolfo 1–1

(Latvia) Malvine Misane – (Latvia) Alise Misane 1–1

(Brazil) Carla Assuncao Calasans – (Trinidad and Tobago) Candida Joaquin 2–0

(Dominican Republic) Elena Panchoo – (United States) Galina Petukhova 0–2

=== Round 3 ===
(Ukraine) Olena Korotka – (China) Saiya Gangsuhe 0–2

(Ukraine) Yulia Makarenkova – (Netherlands) Darya Tkachenko 2–0

(Ukraine) Viktoriya Motrichko – (Poland) Marta Bankowska 1–1

(Italy) Sofia Pandolfo – (Poland) Natalia Sadowska 0–2

(Ukraine) Olga Baltazhy – (Latvia) Malvine Misane 0–2

(Latvia) Alise Misane – (United States) Galina Petukhova 2–0

(Mongolia) Anujin Baatarkhuu – (Mongolia) Tsatsral Tsogtgerel 2–0

(Mongolia) Munkhjin Baatarkhuu – (Brazil) Carla Assuncao Calasans 2–0

(Trinidad and Tobago) Candida Joaquin – (Dominican Republic) Elena Panchoo 0–2

=== Round 4 ===
(China) Saiya Gangsuhe – (Ukraine) Yulia Makarenkova 1–1

(Poland) Natalia Sadowska – (Latvia) Alise Misane 1–1

(Latvia) Malvine Misane – (Mongolia) Anujin Baatarkhuu 0–2

(Netherlands) Darya Tkachenko – (Ukraine) Viktoriya Motrichko 0–2

(Poland) Marta Bankowska – (Ukraine) Olena Korotka 1–1

(Mongolia) Munkhjin Baatarkhuu – (Ukraine) Olga Baltazhy 0–2

(Brazil) Carla Assuncao Calasans – (Dominican Republic) Elena Panchoo 2–0

(United States) Galina Petukhova – (Italy) Sofia Pandolfo 1–1

(Mongolia) Tsatsral Tsogtgerel – (Trinidad and Tobago) Candida Joaquin 2–0

=== Round 5 ===
(China) Saiya Gangsuhe – (Mongolia) Anujin Baatarkhuu 1–1

(Ukraine) Yulia Makarenkova – (Poland) Natalia Sadowska 1–1

(Ukraine) Viktoriya Motrichko – (Latvia) Alise Misane 1–1

(Brazil) Carla Assuncao Calasans – (Poland) Marta Bankowska 0–2

(Ukraine) Olga Baltazhy – (Ukraine) Olena Korotka 1–1

(Latvia) Malvine Misane – (Mongolia) Tsatsral Tsogtgerel 0–2

(United States) Galina Petukhova – (Netherlands) Darya Tkachenko 0–2

(Dominican Republic) Elena Panchoo – (Italy) Sofia Pandolfo 0–2

(Trinidad and Tobago) Candida Joaquin – (Mongolia) Munkhjin Baatarkhuu 0–2

=== Round 6 ===
(Ukraine) Viktoriya Motrichko – (China) Saiya Gangsuhe 2–0

(Mongolia) Anujin Baatarkhuu – (Ukraine) Yulia Makarenkova 1–1

(Poland) Natalia Sadowska – (Mongolia) Tsatsral Tsogtgerel 2–0

(Latvia) Alise Misane – (Poland) Marta Bankowska 1–1

(Italy) Sofia Pandolfo – (Ukraine) Olga Baltazhy 0–2

(Ukraine) Olena Korotka – (Mongolia) Munkhjin Baatarkhuu 1–1

(Netherlands) Darya Tkachenko – (Brazil) Carla Assuncao Calasans 2–0

(Dominican Republic) Elena Panchoo – (Latvia) Malvine Misane 0–2

(Trinidad and Tobago) Candida Joaquin – (United States) Galina Petukhova 0–2

=== Round 7 ===
(Ukraine) Yulia Makarenkova – (Ukraine) Viktoriya Motrichko 1–1

(China) Saiya Gangsuhe – (Poland) Natalia Sadowska 1–1

(Latvia) Alise Misane – (Mongolia) Anujin Baatarkhuu 1–1

(Poland) Marta Bankowska – (Netherlands) Darya Tkachenko 1–1

(Mongolia) Tsatsral Tsogtgerel – (Ukraine) Olga Baltazhy 2–0

(Mongolia) Munkhjin Baatarkhuu – (Latvia) Malvine Misane 1–1

(Ukraine) Olena Korotka – (Dominican Republic) Elena Panchoo 2–0

(United States) Galina Petukhova – (Brazil) Carla Assuncao Calasans 2–0

(Italy) Sofia Pandolfo – (Trinidad and Tobago) Candida Joaquin 2–0

=== Round 8 ===
(Mongolia) Anujin Baatarkhuu – (Ukraine) Viktoriya Motrichko 0–2

(Poland) Natalia Sadowska – (Poland) Marta Bankowska 1–1

(Netherlands) Darya Tkachenko – (China) Saiya Gangsuhe 1–1

(Ukraine) Yulia Makarenkova – (Latvia) Alise Misane 1–1

(Mongolia) Tsatsral Tsogtgerel – (Ukraine) Olena Korotka 0–2

(Ukraine) Olga Baltazhy – (United States) Galina Petukhova 2–0

(Brazil) Carla Assuncao Calasans – (Italy) Sofia Pandolfo 2–0

(Dominican Republic) Elena Panchoo – (Mongolia) Munkhjin Baatarkhuu 0–2

(Latvia) Malvine Misane – (Trinidad and Tobago) Candida Joaquin 2–0

=== Round 9 ===
(Ukraine) Viktoriya Motrichko – (Poland) Natalia Sadowska 1–1

(China) Saiya Gangsuhe – (Latvia) Malvine Misane 2–0

(Ukraine) Olga Baltazhy – (Ukraine) Yulia Makarenkova 1–1

(Ukraine) Olena Korotka – (Mongolia) Anujin Baatarkhuu 1–1

(Italy) Sofia Pandolfo – (Netherlands) Darya Tkachenko 0–2

(Mongolia) Munkhjin Baatarkhuu – (United States) Galina Petukhova 2–0

(Latvia) Alise Misane – (Brazil) Carla Assuncao Calasans 2–0

(Dominican Republic) Elena Panchoo – (Mongolia) Tsatsral Tsogtgerel 1–1

(Trinidad and Tobago) Candida Joaquin – (Poland) Marta Bankowska 0–2
