= 2021 Women's World Draughts Championship match =

Draughts match between Tamara Tansykkuzhina and Natalia Sadowska

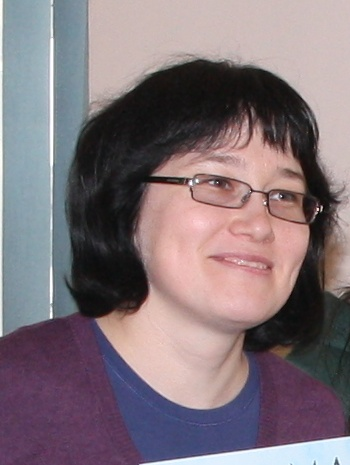
- 2021 Women's World Draughts Champion Tamara Tansykkuzhina

Tournament information
- Location: Warsaw, Poland
- Dates: 23 April–3 May
- Administrator: FMJD
- Tournament format: Match
- Venue: Hotel Bellotto

Final positions
- Champion: Tamara Tansykkuzhina

The 2021 Women's World Draughts Championship match in international draughts was held from 23 April – 3 May 2021 at the Hotel Bellotto in Warsaw, Poland. It was held under the auspices of the International Draughts Federation (FMJD). It was played between the 2019 world champion, Tamara Tansykkuzhina, and the 2018 world champion, Natalia Sadowska. Tamara Tansykkuzhina won her seventh title. The prize money was 20,000€ (12,000€ for the winner and 8,000€ for the loser).

== Rules ==
The match consisted of 9 micro-matches, one per day.

The first game of each micro-match was a standard game: 80 minutes plus a 1-minute increment per move. A victory earned 12 points, while a loss earned 0.

If the standard game was drawn, a rapid game was played: 20 minutes plus a 5-second increment per move. A victory earned 8 points, while a loss earned 4.

If the rapid game was drawn, a blitz game was played: 5 minutes plus a 3-second increment per move. A victory earned 7 points, while a loss earned 5.

If the blitz game was drawn, each player was awarded 6 points.

A player won the championship by scoring more than 54 points. If the score was tied after 9 micro-matches, the title would go to the player with the better score in the standard games. If that was equal, the title would go to the player with the better score in rapid games. If the tie still persisted, a deciding tie-break would be played on the same day as the ninth micro-match.

The tie-break consisted of an unlimited number of games played until the first victory. The first two games were rapid games (20 minutes plus a 5-second increment per move). From the third game onward, blitz games (5 minutes plus a 3-second increment per move) were played until a decisive result.

== Results ==
Place	Name	Country	Round 1 23 Apr	Round 2 24 Apr	Round 3 25 Apr	Round 4 27 Apr	Round 5 28 Apr	Round 6 29 Apr	Round 7 1 May	Round 8 2 May	Round 9 3 May	Total score
1	Tamara Tansykkuzhina	FMJD	4	6	6	0	12	5	7	6	8	54
2	Natalia Sadowska	Poland	8	6	6	12	0	7	5	6	4	54

The score was tied 54–54 after round 9. Tamara Tansykkuzhina won the ensuing tie-break.

=== Tie-break ===
Name	Country	Rapid 1	Rapid 2	Blitz 1	Blitz 2	Blitz 3	Blitz 4	Score
Tamara Tansykkuzhina	FMJD	1	1	1	1	1	2	7
Natalia Sadowska	Poland	1	1	1	1	1	0	5

== See also ==
- List of women's Draughts World Championship winners
- Women's World Draughts Championship
