= 2023 Women's World Draughts Championship =

Draughts tournament

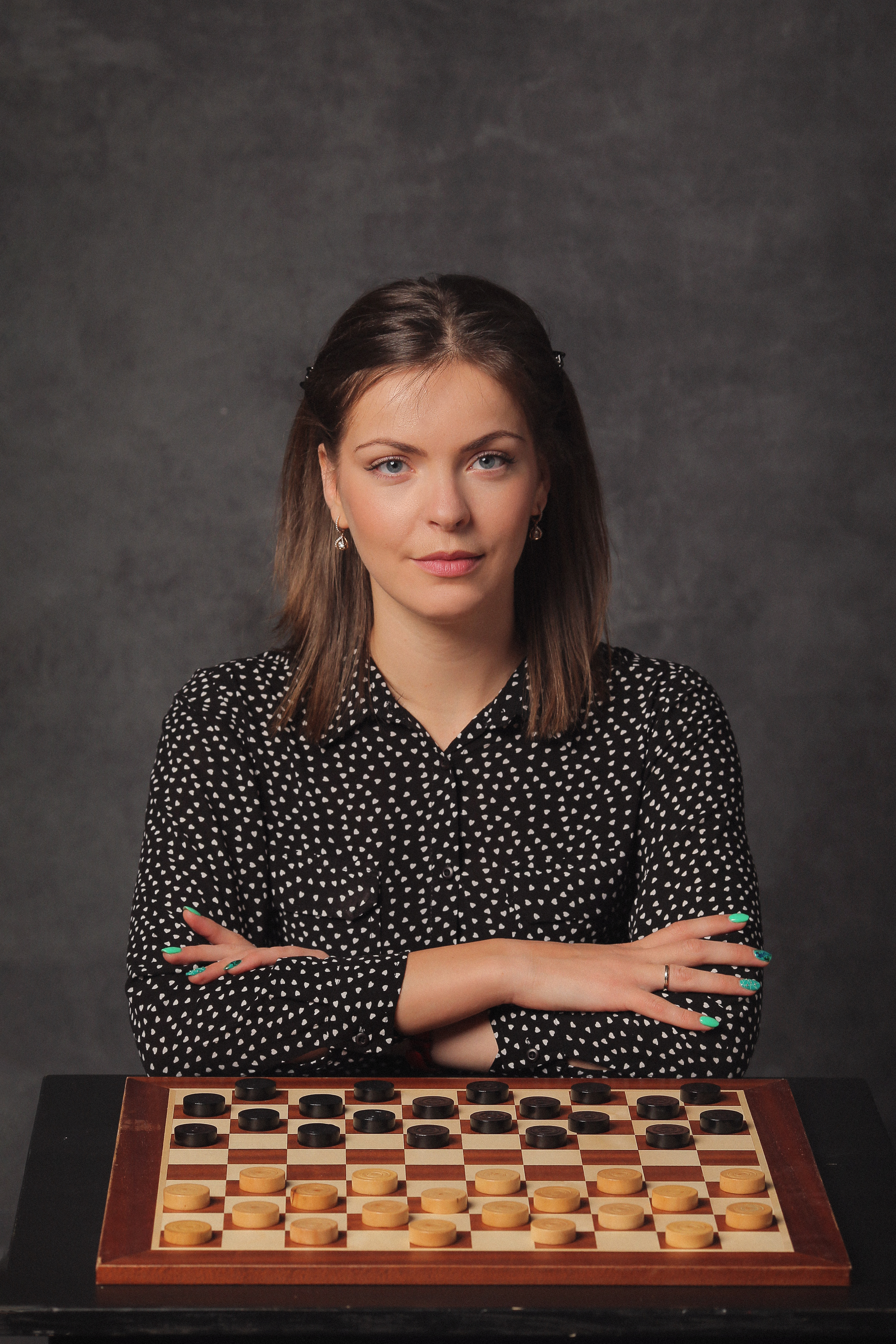
- 2023 Women's World Draughts Champion Viktoriya Motrichko

Tournament information
- Location: Willemstad, Curaçao
- Dates: 28 September–13 October
- Administrator: FMJD
- Tournament format: Round-robin tournament
- Venue: Merakii Seaview Escape Resort

Final positions
- Champion: Viktoriya Motrichko
- Runner-up: Darya Tkachenko

The 2023 Women's World Draughts Championship in international draughts was held from 28 September to 13 October, 2023, at the Merakii Seaview Escape Resort in Willemstad, Curaçao. The championship was played under the auspices of the International Draughts Federation (FMJD) as a round-robin tournament with sixteen players. The total prize money for the tournament was 20,000 euros.

The tournament was characterized by number of changes in the list of participants, as a result of the suspension of the Russian and Belarusian Draughts federations, the coronavirus and visa problems.

Viktoriya Motrichko became world champion for the first time, two points ahead of Darya Tkachenko.

The 2023 World Draughts Championship took place simultaneously at the same location.

== Rules and regulations ==
The games were played with the official FMJD classical time control: 90 minutes for 45 moves, followed by 30 minutes for the rest of the game plus a 30-second increment per move. FMJD regulations prohibited players from agreeing to a draw before each had completed 40 moves; doing so required the referee to award both players 0 points.

The final rankings were determined by total points. If two or more players finished with the same score, the following tiebreaks were applied:

1. Number of wins.
2. Results in the direct encounters between the tied players.
3. Results obtained against opponents in order of their final ranking.

== Schedule ==
| Round | Date | Time |
|---|---|---|
| 1 | 28 September | 15:30 |
| 2 | 29 September | 10:00 |
| 3 | 30 September | 10:00 |
| 4 | 1 October | 10:00 |
| 5 | 2 October | 10:00 |
| 6 | 2 October | 16:00 |
| 7 | 4 October | 10:00 |
| 8 | 5 October | 10:00 |
| 9 | 6 October | 10:00 |
| 10 | 7 October | 10:00 |
| 11 | 8 October | 10:00 |
| 12 | 10 October | 10:00 |
| 13 | 11 October | 10:00 |
| 14 | 12 October | 10:00 |
| 15 | 13 October | 10:00 |

== Participants ==
The published list was preliminary.

- Khuslen Enkhbold, Yesui Batdavaa, Anel Davletova, Adeline Kabore did not take part in the tournament.
- They were replaced by Fleur Kruysmulder, Vitalia Doumesh, Rita Packauskaite and Petra Duskova.

| Number | Name | Country | Qualification path |
|---|---|---|---|
| 1 | Viktoriya Motrichko | Ukraine | 3rd place in Women's World Championship 2021 |
| 2 | Natalia Sadowska | Poland | 4th place in Women's World Championship 2021 |
| 3 | Adeline Kabore | Burkina Faso | Africa |
| 4 | Galina Petukhova | United States | America |
| 5 | Khuslen Enkhbold | Mongolia | Asia |
| 6 | Yesui Batdavaa | Mongolia | Asia |
| 7 | Anel Davletova | Kazakhstan | Asia |
| 8 | Marta Bankowska | Poland | Europe |
| 9 | Katarzyna Stanczuk | Poland | Europe |
| 10 | Olga Baltazhy | Ukraine | Europe |
| 11 | Olena Korotka | Ukraine | Europe |
| 12 | Myja Plestyte | Lithuania | Europe |
| 13 | Lisa Scholtens | Netherlands | Europe |
| 14 | Yulia Makarenkova | Ukraine | Global reserve list |
| 15 | Heike Verheul | Netherlands | Organization place |
| 16 | Darya Tkachenko | FMJD | Sponsor place |

== Final standings ==
| Place | Name | Country | Title | Rating | 1 | 2 | 3 | 4 | 5 | 6 | 7 | 8 | 9 | 10 | 11 | 12 | 13 | 14 | 15 | 16 | Points | Wins | Draws | Losses |
|---|---|---|---|---|---|---|---|---|---|---|---|---|---|---|---|---|---|---|---|---|---|---|---|---|
| 1 | Viktoriya Motrichko | Ukraine | GMIF | 2270 | * | 1 | 1 | 2 | 1 | 1 | 1 | 2 | 1 | 2 | 2 | 2 | 2 | 2 | 2 | 2 | 23 | 8 | 7 | 0 |
| 2 | Darya Tkachenko | FMJD | GMIF | 2212 | 1 | * | 0 | 2 | 2 | 1 | 2 | 1 | 1 | 1 | 1 | 2 | 1 | 2 | 2 | 2 | 21 | 7 | 7 | 1 |
| 3 | Olena Korotka | Ukraine | | 2078 | 1 | 2 | * | 1 | 1 | 1 | 1 | 1 | 1 | 1 | 1 | 1 | 2 | 1 | 2 | 2 | 19 | 4 | 11 | 0 |
| 4 | Lisa Scholtens | Netherlands | MFF | 2065 | 0 | 0 | 1 | * | 1 | 1 | 1 | 2 | 2 | 0 | 2 | 2 | 2 | 1 | 1 | 2 | 18 | 6 | 6 | 3 |
| 5 | Natalia Sadowska | Poland | GMIF | 2245 | 1 | 0 | 1 | 1 | * | 1 | 1 | 1 | 1 | 2 | 1 | 1 | 2 | 2 | 1 | 2 | 18 | 4 | 10 | 1 |
| 6 | Heike Verheul | Netherlands | MIF | 2176 | 1 | 1 | 1 | 1 | 1 | * | 1 | 1 | 2 | 1 | 0 | 1 | 1 | 2 | 1 | 2 | 17 | 3 | 11 | 1 |
| 7 | Marta Bankowska | Poland | GMIF | 2181 | 1 | 0 | 1 | 1 | 1 | 1 | * | 1 | 1 | 1 | 1 | 1 | 1 | 2 | 2 | 2 | 17 | 3 | 11 | 1 |
| 8 | Rita Packauskaite | Lithuania | MIF | 2067 | 0 | 1 | 1 | 0 | 1 | 1 | 1 | * | 2 | 1 | 1 | 0 | 0 | 1 | 2 | 2 | 14 | 3 | 8 | 4 |
| 9 | Katarzyna Stanczuk | Poland | MIF | 2092 | 1 | 1 | 1 | 0 | 1 | 0 | 1 | 0 | * | 1 | 1 | 1 | 1 | 1 | 2 | 2 | 14 | 2 | 10 | 3 |
| 10 | Vitalia Doumesh | Netherlands | MIF | 2111 | 0 | 1 | 1 | 2 | 0 | 1 | 1 | 1 | 1 | * | 1 | 1 | 1 | 0 | 1 | 2 | 14 | 2 | 10 | 3 |
| 11 | Olga Baltazhy | Ukraine | GMIF | 2172 | 0 | 1 | 1 | 1 | 0 | 1 | 1 | 1 | 1 | 2 | * | 1 | 1 | 2 | 1 | 0 | 14 | 2 | 10 | 3 |
| 12 | Fleur Kruysmulder | Netherlands | | 2073 | 0 | 0 | 1 | 0 | 1 | 1 | 1 | 2 | 1 | 1 | 1 | * | 1 | 2 | 1 | 1 | 14 | 2 | 10 | 3 |
| 13 | Yulia Makarenkova | Ukraine | MIF | 2178 | 0 | 1 | 0 | 0 | 0 | 1 | 1 | 2 | 1 | 1 | 1 | 1 | * | 1 | 1 | 2 | 13 | 2 | 9 | 4 |
| 14 | Myja Plestyte | Lithuania | MFF | 2000 | 1 | 0 | 1 | 1 | 0 | 0 | 0 | 1 | 1 | 2 | 0 | 0 | 1 | * | 0 | 2 | 10 | 2 | 6 | 7 |
| 15 | Petra Duskova | Czech Republic | MFF | 2054 | 0 | 0 | 0 | 1 | 1 | 1 | 0 | 0 | 0 | 1 | 1 | 1 | 1 | 2 | * | 1 | 10 | 1 | 8 | 6 |
| 16 | Galina Petukhova | United States | | 1899 | 0 | 0 | 0 | 0 | 0 | 0 | 0 | 0 | 0 | 0 | 2 | 1 | 0 | 0 | 1 | * | 4 | 1 | 2 | 12 |

GMIF — women's international grandmaster

MIF — women's international master

MFF — women's master FMJD

== Results by round ==
=== Round 1 ===
- (Netherlands) Vitalia Doumesh – (United States) Galina Petukhova 2–0
- (Netherlands) Heike Verheul – (Czech Republic) Petra Duskova 1–1
- (Netherlands) Fleur Kruysmulder – (Lithuania) Rita Packauskaite 2–0
- (Lithuania) Myja Plestyte – (Ukraine) Olena Korotka 1–1
- (Netherlands) Lisa Scholtens – (Poland) Katarzyna Stanczuk 2–0
- (Poland) Natalia Sadowska – (Poland) Marta Bankowska 1–1
- FMJD Darya Tkachenko – (Ukraine) Viktoriya Motrichko 1–1
- (Ukraine) Olga Baltazhy – (Ukraine) Yulia Makarenkova 1–1

=== Round 2 ===
- (Lithuania) Rita Packauskaite – (Lithuania) Myja Plestyte 1–1
- (United States) Galina Petukhova – (Ukraine) Yulia Makarenkova 0–2
- (Ukraine) Viktoriya Motrichko – (Ukraine) Olga Baltazhy 2–0
- (Poland) Marta Bankowska – FMJD Darya Tkachenko 0–2
- (Poland) Katarzyna Stanczuk – (Poland) Natalia Sadowska 1–1
- (Ukraine) Olena Korotka – (Netherlands) Lisa Scholtens 1–1
- (Czech Republic) Petra Duskova – (Netherlands) Fleur Kruysmulder 1–1
- (Netherlands) Vitalia Doumesh – (Netherlands) Heike Verheul 1–1

=== Round 3 ===
- (Netherlands) Heike Verheul – (United States) Galina Petukhova 2–0
- (Netherlands) Fleur Kruysmulder – (Netherlands) Vitalia Doumesh 1–1
- (Lithuania) Myja Plestyte – (Czech Republic) Petra Duskova 0–2
- (Netherlands) Lisa Scholtens – (Lithuania) Rita Packauskaite 2–0
- FMJD Darya Tkachenko – (Poland) Katarzyna Stanczuk 1–1
- (Poland) Natalia Sadowska – (Ukraine) Olena Korotka 1–1
- (Ukraine) Olga Baltazhy – (Poland) Marta Bankowska 1–1
- (Ukraine) Yulia Makarenkova– (Ukraine) Viktoriya Motrichko 0–2

=== Round 4 ===
- (United States) Galina Petukhova – (Ukraine) Viktoriya Motrichko 0–2
- (Poland) Marta Bankowska – (Ukraine) Yulia Makarenkova 1–1
- (Poland) Katarzyna Stanczuk – (Ukraine) Olga Baltazhy 1–1
- (Lithuania) Rita Packauskaite – (Poland) Natalia Sadowska 1–1
- (Ukraine) Olena Korotka – FMJD Darya Tkachenko 2–0
- (Czech Republic) Petra Duskova – (Netherlands) Lisa Scholtens 1–1
- (Netherlands) Heike Verheul – (Netherlands) Fleur Kruysmulder 1–1
- (Netherlands) Vitalia Doumesh – (Lithuania) Myja Plestyte 0–2

=== Round 5 ===
- (Netherlands) Fleur Kruysmulder – (United States) Galina Petukhova 1–1
- (Lithuania) Myja Plestyte – (Netherlands) Heike Verheul 0–2
- (Netherlands) Lisa Scholtens – (Netherlands) Vitalia Doumesh 0–2
- (Poland) Natalia Sadowska – (Czech Republic) Petra Duskova 1–1
- FMJD Darya Tkachenko – (Lithuania) Rita Packauskaite 1–1
- (Ukraine) Olga Baltazhy – (Ukraine) Olena Korotka 1–1
- (Ukraine) Yulia Makarenkova – (Poland) Katarzyna Stanczuk 1–1
- (Ukraine) Viktoriya Motrichko – (Poland) Marta Bankowska 1–1

=== Round 6 ===
- (United States) Galina Petukhova – (Poland) Marta Bankowska 0–2
- (Ukraine) Olena Korotka – (Ukraine) Yulia Makarenkova 2–0
- (Poland) Katarzyna Stanczuk – (Ukraine) Viktoriya Motrichko 1–1
- (Lithuania) Rita Packauskaite – (Ukraine) Olga Baltazhy 1–1
- (Netherlands) Vitalia Doumesh – (Poland) Natalia Sadowska 0–2
- (Czech Republic) Petra Duskova – FMJD Darya Tkachenko 0–2
- (Netherlands) Heike Verheul – (Netherlands) Lisa Scholtens 1–1
- (Netherlands) Fleur Kruysmulder – (Lithuania) Myja Plestyte 2–0

=== Round 7 ===
- (Lithuania) Myja Plestyte – (United States) Galina Petukhova 2–0
- (Netherlands) Lisa Scholtens – (Netherlands) Fleur Kruysmulder 2–0
- (Poland) Natalia Sadowska – (Netherlands) Heike Verheul 1–1
- FMJD Darya Tkachenko – (Netherlands) Vitalia Doumesh 1–1
- (Ukraine) Olga Baltazhy – (Czech Republic) Petra Duskova 1–1
- (Ukraine) Yulia Makarenkova – (Lithuania) Rita Packauskaite 2–0
- (Ukraine) Viktoriya Motrichko – (Ukraine) Olena Korotka 1–1
- (Poland) Marta Bankowska – (Poland) Katarzyna Stanczuk 1–1

=== Round 8 ===
- (United States) Galina Petukhova – (Poland) Katarzyna Stanczuk 0–2
- (Ukraine) Olena Korotka – (Poland) Marta Bankowska 1–1
- (Lithuania) Rita Packauskaite – (Ukraine) Viktoriya Motrichko 0–2
- (Netherlands) Vitalia Doumesh – (Ukraine) Olga Baltazhy 1–1
- (Czech Republic) Petra Duskova – (Ukraine) Yulia Makarenkova 1–1
- (Netherlands) Heike Verheul – FMJD Darya Tkachenko 1–1
- (Netherlands) Fleur Kruysmulder – (Poland) Natalia Sadowska 1–1
- (Lithuania) Myja Plestyte – (Netherlands) Lisa Scholtens 1–1

=== Round 9 ===
- (Netherlands) Lisa Scholtens – (United States) Galina Petukhova 2–0
- (Poland) Natalia Sadowska – (Lithuania) Myja Plestyte 2–0
- FMJD Darya Tkachenko – (Netherlands) Fleur Kruysmulder 2–0
- (Ukraine) Olga Baltazhy – (Netherlands) Heike Verheul 2–0
- (Ukraine) Yulia Makarenkova – (Netherlands) Vitalia Doumesh 1–1
- (Ukraine) Viktoriya Motrichko – (Czech Republic) Petra Duskova 2–0
- (Poland) Marta Bankowska – (Lithuania) Rita Packauskaite 1–1
- (Ukraine) Olena Korotka – (Poland) Katarzyna Stanczuk 1–1

=== Round 10 ===
- (United States) Galina Petukhova – (Ukraine) Olena Korotka 0–2
- (Lithuania) Rita Packauskaite – (Poland) Katarzyna Stanczuk 2–0
- (Netherlands) Vitalia Doumesh – (Ukraine) Viktoriya Motrichko 0–2
- (Czech Republic) Petra Duskova – (Poland) Marta Bankowska 0–2
- (Netherlands) Heike Verheul – (Ukraine) Yulia Makarenkova 1–1
- (Netherlands) Fleur Kruysmulder – (Ukraine) Olga Baltazhy 1–1
- (Lithuania) Myja Plestyte – FMJD Darya Tkachenko 0–2
- (Netherlands) Lisa Scholtens – (Poland) Natalia Sadowska 1–1

=== Round 11 ===
- (Poland) Natalia Sadowska – (United States) Galina Petukhova 2–0
- FMJD Darya Tkachenko – (Netherlands) Lisa Scholtens 2–0
- (Ukraine) Olga Baltazhy – (Lithuania) Myja Plestyte 2–0
- (Ukraine) Yulia Makarenkova – (Netherlands) Fleur Kruysmulder 1–1
- (Ukraine) Viktoriya Motrichko – (Netherlands) Heike Verheul 1–1
- (Poland) Marta Bankowska – (Netherlands) Vitalia Doumesh 1–1
- (Poland) Katarzyna Stanczuk – (Czech Republic) Petra Duskova 2–0
- (Ukraine) Olena Korotka – (Lithuania) Rita Packauskaite 1–1

=== Round 12 ===
- (Poland) Natalia Sadowska – FMJD Darya Tkachenko 0–2
- (United States) Galina Petukhova – (Lithuania) Rita Packauskaite 0–2
- (Netherlands) Lisa Scholtens – (Ukraine) Olga Baltazhy 2–0
- (Lithuania) Myja Plestyte – (Ukraine) Yulia Makarenkova 1–1
- (Netherlands) Fleur Kruysmulder – (Ukraine) Viktoriya Motrichko 0–2
- (Netherlands) Heike Verheul – (Poland) Marta Bankowska 1–1
- (Netherlands) Vitalia Doumesh – (Poland) Katarzyna Stanczuk 1–1
- (Czech Republic) Petra Duskova – (Ukraine) Olena Korotka 0–2

=== Round 13 ===
- FMJD Darya Tkachenko – (United States) Galina Petukhova 2–0
- (Ukraine) Olga Baltazhy – (Poland) Natalia Sadowska 1–1
- (Ukraine) Yulia Makarenkova – (Netherlands) Lisa Scholtens 0–2
- (Ukraine) Viktoriya Motrichko – (Lithuania) Myja Plestyte 1–1
- (Poland) Marta Bankowska – (Netherlands) Fleur Kruysmulder 1–1
- (Poland) Katarzyna Stanczuk – (Netherlands) Heike Verheul 0–2
- (Ukraine) Olena Korotka – (Netherlands) Vitalia Doumesh 1–1
- (Lithuania) Rita Packauskaite – (Czech Republic) Petra Duskova 2–0

=== Round 14 ===
- (Poland) Natalia Sadowska – (Ukraine) Yulia Makarenkova 2–0
- FMJD Darya Tkachenko – (Ukraine) Olga Baltazhy 1–1
- (United States) Galina Petukhova – (Czech Republic) Petra Duskova 1–1
- (Netherlands) Lisa Scholtens – (Ukraine) Viktoriya Motrichko 0–2
- (Lithuania) Myja Plestyte – (Poland) Marta Bankowska 0–2
- (Netherlands) Fleur Kruysmulder – (Poland) Katarzyna Stanczuk 1–1
- (Netherlands) Heike Verheul – (Ukraine) Olena Korotka 1–1
- (Netherlands) Vitalia Doumesh – (Lithuania) Rita Packauskaite 1–1

=== Round 15 ===
- (Ukraine) Olga Baltazhy – (United States) Galina Petukhova 0–2
- (Ukraine) Yulia Makarenkova – FMJD Darya Tkachenko 1–1
- (Ukraine) Viktoriya Motrichko – (Poland) Natalia Sadowska 1–1
- (Poland) Marta Bankowska – (Netherlands) Lisa Scholtens 1–1
- (Poland) Katarzyna Stanczuk – (Lithuania) Myja Plestyte 1–1
- (Ukraine) Olena Korotka – (Netherlands) Fleur Kruysmulder 1–1
- (Lithuania) Rita Packauskaite – (Netherlands) Heike Verheul 1–1
- (Czech Republic) Petra Duskova – (Netherlands) Vitalia Doumesh 1–1
