= 2024 Women's World Draughts Championship match =

Draughts match between Viktoriya Motrichko and Darya Tkachenko

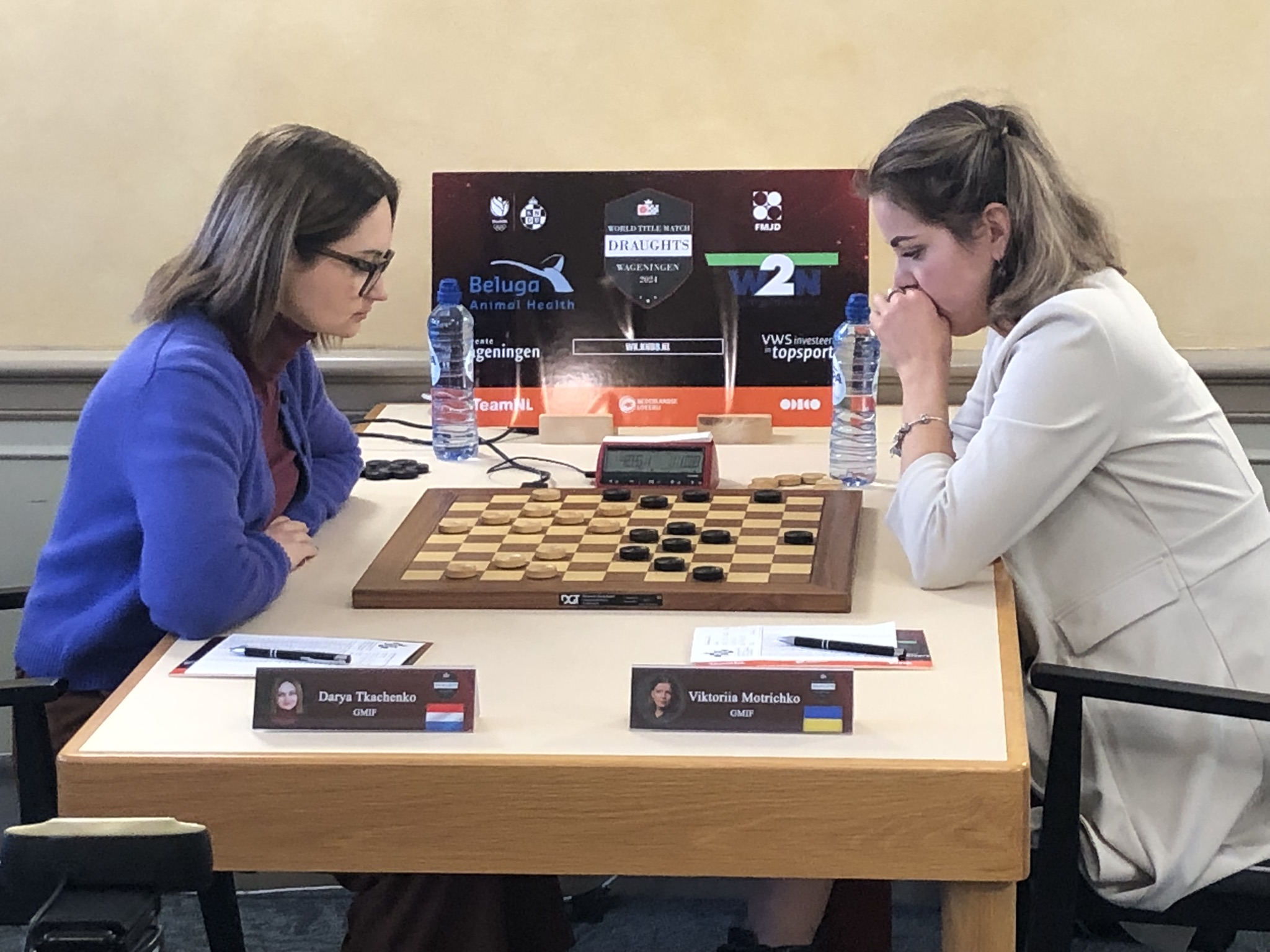
- Darya Tkachenko (left) vs Viktoriya Motrichko (right)

Tournament information
- Location: Wageningen, Netherlands
- Dates: 19 December–31 December
- Administrator: FMJD
- Tournament format: Match
- Venue: Wageningen City Hall

Final positions
- Champion: Darya Tkachenko

The 2024 Women's World Draughts Championship match in international draughts was held from 19 to 31 December, 2024 at the Wageningen City Hall in Wageningen, Netherlands. It was held under the auspices of the International Draughts Federation (FMJD) and played between the reigning 2023 world champion, Viktoriya Motrichko, and the runner-up of the previous championship, Darya Tkachenko.

Darya Tkachenko won the match to capture her fifth world championship title.

== Rules and regulations ==
The match consisted of 12 games, played with a time control of 90 minutes for the first 45 moves, followed by 30 minutes for the rest of the game plus a 30-second increment per move. The player with the highest score won the world title if he won at least two games. If not, tie-break games were played until one player achieved a second overall win.

The first tie-break was 2 rapid games, 20 minutes plus a 10-second increment per move. The second tie-break was 4 blitz games, 10 minutes plus a 5-second increment per move. The third tie-break was Superblitz (limited time for an unlimited number of games until the first victory), 10 minutes plus a 2-second increment per move.

== Results ==
=== Regular games ===
Player	Rating FMJD	1	2	3	4	5	6	7	8	9	10	11	12	Points	Victories
(Netherlands) Darya Tkachenko	2256	1	1	1	1	2	1	1	0	1	1	1	1	12	1
(Ukraine) Viktoriya Motrichko	2278	1	1	1	1	0	1	1	2	1	1	1	1	12	1

=== Tie-break ===
Player	Rating rapid FMJD	Rapid game 1	Rapid game 2	Victories	Total victories
(Netherlands) Darya Tkachenko	2256	1	2	1	2
(Ukraine) Viktoriya Motrichko	2278	1	0	0	1

== See also ==
- List of women's Draughts World Championship winners
