= Women's World Draughts-64 Championship =

The Women's Draughts-64 World Championship has been organized by the World Draughts Federation (FMJD) since 1993 for Brazilian and Russian draughts.

== History ==
The first and almost other championships was held in Russian draughts. In Brazilian draughts was held championship in 2007 and in 2018.

Since 2003 took place Draughts-64 World Championship in formats blitz (3 min + 2 sec) and rapid (7 min + 5 sec) also.

== Classic ==
Number	Year	Type	Country	Gold	Silver	Bronze
1	1993	Russian	(Ukraine) Kerch	(Russia) Ekaterina Bushueva	(Ukraine) Yulia Makarenkova	(Latvia) Anastasia Vinogradova
2	1994	Russian	(Ukraine) Alushta	(Ukraine) Yulia Makarenkova	(Lithuania) Vladislava Androloic	(Ukraine) Olga Reinish
3	1996	Russian	(Ukraine) Alushta	(Ukraine) Olga Reinish	(Russia) Ekaterina Bushueva	(Ukraine) Yulia Makarenkova
4	1997	Russian	(Ukraine) Alushta	(Russia) Ekaterina Bushueva	(Ukraine) Natalia Esina	(Ukraine) Ludmila Sivuk
5	1999	Russian	(Ukraine) Simferopol	(Ukraine) Yulia Makarenkova	(Russia) Ekaterina Bushueva	(Ukraine) Ludmila Svir
6	2001	Russian	(Ukraine) Alushta	(Moldova) Elena Borisova	(Ukraine) Yulia Makarenkova	(Ukraine) Ludmila Svir
7	2003	Russian	(Russia) Saint Petersburg	(Russia) Antonina Langina	(Ukraine) Yulia Makarenkova	(Ukraine) Ludmila Svir
8	2005	Russian	(Ukraine) Dneprodzerzhinsk	(Moldova) Elena Miskova	(Ukraine) Viktoriya Motrichko	(Ukraine) Olga Reinish
9	2006 (Match)	Russian	(Poland) Nidzica	(Moldova) Elena Miskova		match with (Russia) Antonina Langina 2 : 1
10	2007	Brazilian	(Russia) Saint Petersburg	(Ukraine) Viktoriya Motrichko	(Russia) Zhanna Sarshaeva	(Ukraine) Yulia Makarenkova
11	2009	Russian	(Ukraine) Rubizhne	(Ukraine) Yulia Makarenkova	(Russia) Natalia Fedorova	(Ukraine) Viktoriya Motrichko
12	2011	Russian	(Russia) Saint Petersburg	(Russia) Natalia Fedorova	(Russia) Zhanna Sarshaeva	(Ukraine) Viktoriya Motrichko
13	2013	Russian	(Russia) Saint Petersburg	(Russia) Zhanna Sarshaeva	(Russia) Stepanida Kirillina	(Ukraine) Viktoriya Motrichko
14	2015	Russian, IDF	(Russia) Saint Petersburg	(Moldova) Elena Scovitina	(Russia) Zhanna Sarshaeva	(Ukraine) Yulia Makarenkova
15	2017	Russian, IDF	(Russia) Saint Petersburg	(Russia) Zhanna Sarshaeva	(Moldova) Elena Scovitina	(Belarus) Darja Fedorovich
16	2018	Brazilian	(Turkey) İzmir	(Ukraine) Olena Korotka	(Ukraine) Yulia Makarenkova	(China) Liu Pei
17	2018	Russian	(Russia) Nizhnevartovsk	(Ukraine) Olena Korotka	(Russia) Zhanna Bupeeva	(Russia) Matrena Nogovitsyna
18	2019	Russian, IDF	(Bulgaria) Sveti Vlas	(Belarus) Yana Yakubovich	(Belarus) Darja Fedorovich	(Belarus) Anastasiya Baryshava
19	2020	Russian	(Turkey) Kuşadası	(Ukraine) Yulia Makarenkova	(Russia) Zhanna Bupeeva	(Russia) Kristina Vatolina
20	2022	Russian, IDF	(Georgia (country)) Kobuleti	NA1 Viktoryia Nikalayeva	NA2 Nika Leopoldova	NA1 Polina Petruseva
21	2024	Russian, IDF	(Russia) Moscow Oblast	NA2 Tunaara Fyodorova	NA1 Viktoryia Nikalayeva	NA2 Zhanna Sarshaeva
22	2026	Russian, IDF	(Russia) Moscow Oblast	(Belarus) Viktoryia Nikalayeva	(Russia) Daiaana Kondrateva	(Russia) Sandaara Aprosimova

== Rapid ==
Number	Year	Type	Country	Gold	Silver	Bronze
1	2003	Russian	(Russia) Saint Petersburg	(Ukraine) Yulia Makarenkova	(Ukraine) Ludmila Svir	(Ukraine) Olga Reinish
2	2005	Russian	(Ukraine) Dneprodzerzhinsk	(Moldova) Elena Miskova	(Russia) Natalia Fedorova	(Ukraine) Yulia Makarenkova
3	2007	Brazilian	(Poland) Mława	(Moldova) Elena Miskova	(Ukraine) Yulia Makarenkova	(Russia) Stepanida Kirillina
4	2009	Russian	(Ukraine) Rubizhne	(Moldova) Elena Miskova	(Ukraine) Olena Korotka	(Russia) Stepanida Kirillina
5	2011	Russian	(Russia) Saint Petersburg	(Russia) Natalia Fedorova	(Ukraine) Yulia Makarenkova	(Ukraine) Viktoriya Motrichko
6	2013	Russian	(Russia) Saint Petersburg	(Russia) Stepanida Kirillina	(Ukraine) Viktoriya Motrichko	(Ukraine) Yulia Makarenkova
7	2015	Brazilian, IDF	(Russia) Saint Petersburg	(Russia) Sofia Morozova	(Belarus) Darya Fedorovich	(Russia) Zhanna Sarshaeva
8	2017	Brazilian	(Russia) Saint Petersburg	(Moldova) Elena Scovitina	(Ukraine) Yulia Makarenkova	(Belarus) Anastasiya Baryshava
9	2018	Brazilian	(Turkey) İzmir	(Ukraine) Yulia Makarenkova	(Russia) Saiyyna Popova	(Ukraine) Olena Korotka
10	2018	Russian	(Russia) Nizhnevartovsk	(Russia) Matrena Nogovitsyna	(Russia) Zhanna Sarshaeva	(Russia) Kristina Vatolina
11	2019	Russian, IDF	(Bulgaria) Sveti Vlas	(Belarus) Darja Fedorovich	(Belarus) Vera Khvashchynskaya	(Moldova) Cristina Zaruba
12	2020	Brazilian	(Turkey) Kuşadası	(Russia) Matrena Nogovitsyna	(Russia) Natalia Shestakova	(Russia) Zhanna Bupeeva
13	2022	Brazilian, IDF	(Georgia (country)) Kobuleti	NA1 Viktoryia Nikalayeva	NA1 Vera Khvaschynskaya	NA2 Nika Leopoldova
14	2024	Brazilian, IDF	(Russia) Moscow Oblast	NA2 Anastasia Arkhangelskaya	NA1 Maria Taranina	NA2 Nika Leopoldova
15	2026	Brazilian, IDF	(Russia) Moscow Oblast	(Russia) Sandaara Aprosimova	(Russia) Tunaara Fyodorova	(Belarus) Evgeniya Shved

== Blitz ==
Number	Year	Type	Country	Gold	Silver	Bronze
1	2003	Russian	(Russia) Saint Petersburg	(Ukraine) Yulia Makarenkova	(Moldova) Elena Borisova	(Ukraine) Olga Reinish
2	2005	Russian	(Ukraine) Dneprodzerzhinsk	(Russia) Antonina Langina	(Ukraine) Yulia Makarenkova	(Moldova) Elena Miskova
3	2007	Brazilian	(Poland) Mława	(Moldova) Elena Miskova	(Ukraine) Yulia Makarenkova	(Russia) Stepanida Kirillina
4	2009	Russian	(Ukraine) Rubizhne	(Moldova) Elena Miskova	(Ukraine) Olena Korotka	(Russia) Natalia Fedorova
5	2011	Russian	(Russia) Saint Petersburg	(Russia) Zhanna Sarshaeva	(Russia) Stepanida Kirillina	(Ukraine) Yulia Makarenkova
6	2013	Russian	(Russia) Saint Petersburg	(Russia) Stepanida Kirillina	(Ukraine) Yulia Makarenkova	(Ukraine) Viktoriya Motrichko
7	2015	Russian, IDF	(Russia) Saint Petersburg	(Moldova) Elena Scovitina	(Russia) Zhanna Sarshaeva	(Russia) Nika Leopoldova
8	2017	Russian, IDF	(Russia) Saint Petersburg	(Moldova) Elena Scovitina	(Russia) Sofia Morozova	(Belarus) Vera Khvashchynskaya
9	2018	Brazilian	(Turkey) İzmir	(Ukraine) Olena Korotka	(Ukraine) Yulia Makarenkova	(China) Guan Ylyang
10	2018	Russian	(Russia) Nizhnevartovsk	(Ukraine) Olena Korotka	(Russia) Matrena Nogovitsyna	(Russia) Kristina Vatolina
11	2019	Russian, IDF	(Bulgaria) Sveti Vlas	(Belarus) Yana Yakubovich	(Belarus) Darja Fedorovich	(Belarus) Vera Khvashchynskaya
12	2020	Brazilian	(Turkey) Kuşadası	(Ukraine) Yulia Makarenkova	(Russia) Sofia Morozova-Orlova	(Russia) Zhanna Bupeeva
13	2022	Russian, IDF	(Georgia (country)) Kobuleti	NA1 Viktoryia Nikalayeva	(Kazakhstan) Altynay Jumagaldiyeva	NA1 Vera Khvaschynskaya
14	2024	Russian, IDF	(Russia) Moscow Oblast	NA2 Sandaara Aprosimova	NA2 Zhanna Sarshaeva	NA2 Tunaara Fyodorova
15	2026	Russian, IDF	(Russia) Moscow Oblast	(Russia) Zhanna Sarshaeva	(Russia) Daiaana Kondrateva	(Russia) Nika Leopoldova
