= Olga Baltazhy =

Ukrainian draughts player

- Born: Olga Semenovna Hazanovich; April 28, 1970 (age 55); Zaporizhia, Ukrainian SSR

Olga Baltazhy, nee Olga Hazanovich (Ukrainian: Ольга Семенівна Балтажі; born April 28, 1970, Zaporizhia, Ukrainian SSR) is a Ukrainian player in the International draughts. Many times champion of Ukraine in International draughts. Olga Baltazhy is a Women's International grandmaster (GMIF). She train by her husband vice president Ukrainian draughts federation Konstantin Baltazhy.

== Career ==
Olga Baltazhy was European champion in 2014 and Women's Draughts Championship winners in blitz (2015). She took second place at 2001 Women's Draughts Championship, 2017 Women's Draughts Championship (rapid), was third at Women's Draughts Championship in 1995, 2003, 2009 (blitz) and 2012 (blitz), was second at Women's European Championship in 2000 and 2002.

Set a record for Ukraine in the number of boards in a simultaneous game – 100 (May 11, 2013).

In 1994 graduated Faculty of Economics Zaporizhzhya National University. From 2008 lived in Ivano-Frankivsk.

In 2015 Olga Baltazhy was awarded Order of Princess Olga.

== World Championship ==
- 1995 (3 place)
- 1997 (6 place)
- 1999 (7 place)
- 2001 (2 place)
- 2003 (3 place)
- 2005 (9 place)
- 2007 (9 place)
- 2010 (5 place)
- 2011 (9 place)
- 2015 (15 place)
- 2017 (9 place)
- 2023 (11 place)
- 2025 (11 place).

== European Championship ==
- 2000 (2 place)
- 2002 (2 place)
- 2004 (7 place)
- 2006 (4 place)
- 2008 (27 place)
- 2010 (6 place)
- 2012 (25 place)
- 2014 (1 place)
- 2016 (4 place)
