= Zhanna Bupeeva =

Russian draughts player

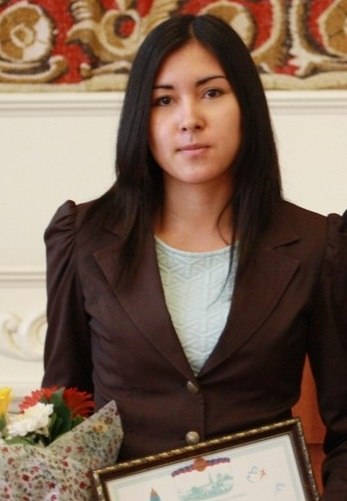

Personal information
- Born: Zhanna Sarshaeva; April 29, 1993 (age 33) Astrakhan Oblast, Russia

Sport
- Sport: Draughts
- Team: Russia
Medal record
Representing Russia
Draughts
World Draughts-64 championships
Gold medal – first place	St.Petersburg 2013	Russian draughts
Gold medal – first place	St.Petersburg 2017	Russian draughts
Silver medal – second place	St.Petersburg 2007	Brazilian draughts
Silver medal – second place	St.Petersburg 2011	Russian draughts
Silver medal – second place	St.Petersburg 2017	Russian draughts
Silver medal – second place	Nizhnevartovsk 2018	Russian draughts
European Draughts-64 championships
Gold medal – first place	St.Petersburg 2014	Russian draughts
Gold medal – first place	Tbilisi 2016	Russian draughts

Zhanna Bupeeva (Russian: Жанна Бупеева (Саршаева); born April 29, 1993, in settlement Wolodarski in Astrakhan Oblast, Russia) is a Russian player in the Russian and Brazilian draughts. She was world champion in Russian draughts 2013 and 2017, took second place in 2007 (Brazilian draughts), 2011, 2015 and 2018, European champion in Russian draughts 2014 and 2016. Many times champion of Russia. Zhanna Bupeeva is Women's International grandmaster (GMIF) since 2008.

She graduated Astrakhan State Technical University in 2015 and is studying at Lesgaft National State University of Physical Education, Sport and Health.
