= 2018 Women's World Draughts Championship match =

Draughts match between Zoja Golubeva and Natalia Sadowska

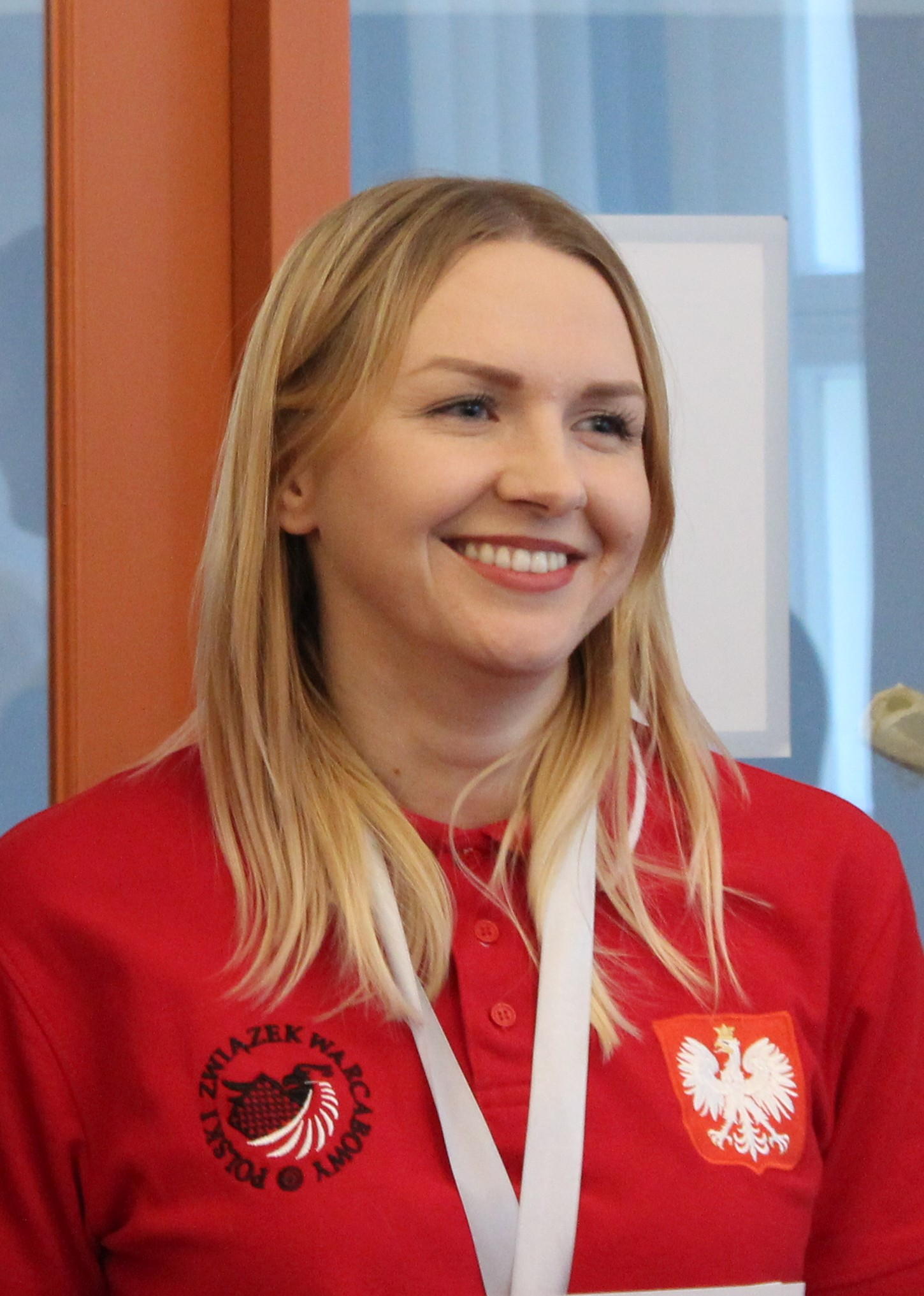
- 2018 Women's World Draughts Champion Natalia Sadowska

Tournament information
- Location: Riga, Latvia
- Dates: 19 November–30 November
- Administrator: FMJD
- Tournament format: Match
- Venue: Grand Hotel Kempinski Riga

Final positions
- Champion: Natalia Sadowska

The 2018 Women's World Draughts Championship match in international draughts was held from 19–30 November 2018 at the Grand Hotel Kempinski Riga in Riga, Latvia. Under the auspieces of the International Draughts Federation (FMJD), the match was played between the 2017 world champion, Zoja Golubeva, and the 2016 world champion, Natalia Sadowska. Natalia Sadowska won her second title.

== Rules ==
The match consisted of 9 micro-matches, one per day.

The first game of each micro-match was a standard game: 80 minutes plus a 1-minute increment per move. A victory earned 12 points, while a loss earned 0.

If the standard game was drawn, a rapid game was played: 20 minutes plus a 5-second increment per move. A victory earned 8 points, while a loss earned 4.

If the rapid game was drawn, a blitz game was played: 5 minutes plus a 3-second increment per move. A victory earned 7 points, while a loss earned 5.

If the blitz game was drawn, each player was awarded 6 points.

A player won the championship by scoring more than 54 points. If the score was tied after 9 micro-matches, the title would go to the player with the better score in the standard games. If that was equal, the title would go to the player with the better score in rapid games. If the tie still persisted, a deciding tie-break would be played on the day after the ninth micro-match.

The tie-break consisted of an unlimited number of games played until the first victory. The first four games were rapid games (20 minutes plus a 5-second increment per move). From the fifth game onward, blitz games (5 minutes plus a 3-second increment per move) were played until a decisive result.

== Results ==
Place	Name	Country	Round 1	Round 2	Round 3	Round 4	Round 5	Round 6	Round 7	Round 8	Round 9	Total score
1	Natalia Sadowska	Poland	0	6	6	12	6	6	12	4	6	58
2	Zoja Golubeva	Latvia	12	6	6	0	6	6	0	8	6	50

== See also ==
- List of women's Draughts World Championship winners
- Women's World Draughts Championship
