= Elena Scovitina =

Personal information
- Born: August 19, 1986 (age 39) Bender, Moldavian SSR

Sport
- Sport: Draughts
- Team: Moldova
Medal record
Representing Moldova
Draughts
World Mind Sports Games
Silver medal – second place	2008 Beijing	Russian draughts
World Draughts-64 championships
Gold medal – first place	Kamianske 2005	Russian draughts
Gold medal – first place	Saint Petersburg 2006	Russian draughts
Gold medal – first place	Saint Petersburg 2015	Russian draughts
Silver medal – second place	Saint Petersburg 2017	Russian draughts
European Draughts-64 championships
Gold medal – first place	Kaluga 2004	Russian draughts
Gold medal – first place	Kargopol 2008	Russian draughts
Silver medal – second place	Kranevo 2018	Russian draughts

Elena Scovitina-Miskova (born August 19, 1986) is a Moldovan draughts player in Brazilian and Russian draughts, world champion in 2005, 2006 and 2015 and European champion in 2004 and 2008, Many times champion of Moldova, international grandmaster since 2005.

Elena Miskova also played in international draughts — in 2002 she won European Youth Championship Girls – 16, in 2005 was third in Junior World Championship.

== Results in World Championship and European Championship in draughts-64 ==
Year	Level	Location	Tournament/match	Result	Place
2004	EC	(Russia) Kaluga	Tournament		1
2005	WC	(Ukraine) Kamianske	Tournament		1
2006	WC	(Russia) Saint Petersburg	Match with (Russia) Antonina Langina	2-1 (set)	1
2006	EC	(Germany) Saarbrücken	Tournament	4+ 3= 2-	6
2008	EC	(Russia) Kargopol	Tournament	6+ 3= 0-	1
2008	WMSG 2008	(China) Beijing	Tournament	6+ 3= 1-	2
2009	WC	(Ukraine) Rubizhne	Tournament	3+ 2= 2-	4
2015	WC	(Russia) Saint Petersburg	Tournament	6+ 2= 1-	1
2017	WC	(Russia) Saint Petersburg	Tournament + play-off	3+ 5= 0- *	2
2018	EC	(Bulgaria) Kranevo	Tournament + play-off	5+ 2= 0- *	2

- After preliminary
