= Natalia Sadowska =

Polish draughts player (born 1991)

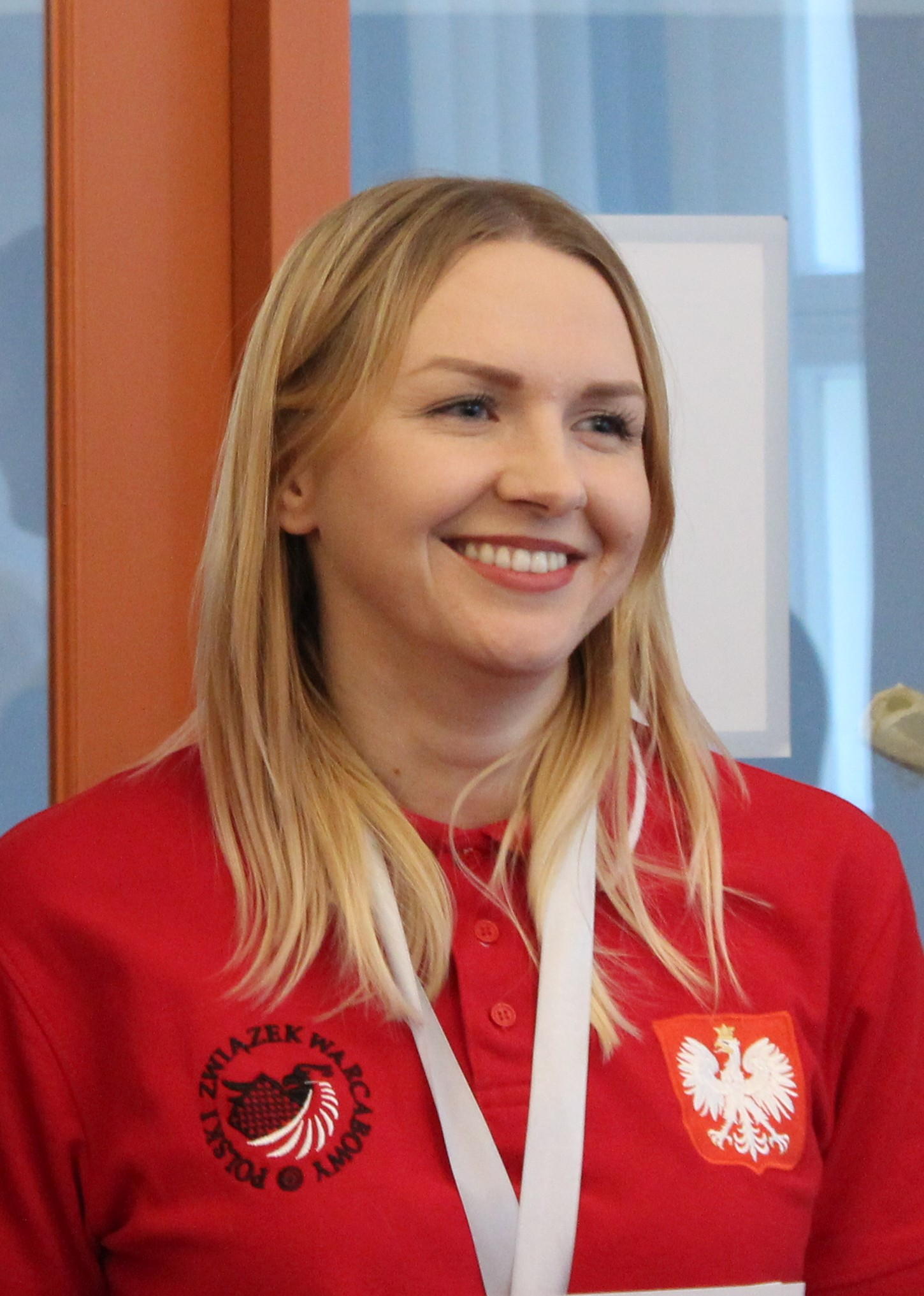

Personal information
- Born: July 27, 1991 (age 34) Mława

Sport
- Sport: Draughts

Achievements and titles
- World finals: WC 2
- National finals: 4

Natalia Sadowska (born 27 July 1991) is a Polish draughts player who ranked third at the Women's Draughts European Championship in 2010 and whose successes go back to 2007. She is a highly rated women's player for Poland and was second at the 2015 Women's World Draughts Championship in Wuhan. In 2016 won title women's world draughts champion in the match with Olga Kamyshleeva. In 2018 won title women's world draughts champion in the match with Zoja Golubeva.

In 2016 she was second at the first women's world championship of Turkish draughts.

International grandmaster (GMIF). She is a student at the National Defence University of Warsaw.

== World Championship ==
- 2011 (10 place)
- 2013 (8 place)
- 2015 (2 place)
- 2016 (2 place in turkish draughts)
- 2016 (won title in match)
- 2017 (4 place)
- 2018 (won title in match)
- 2019 (5 place)
- 2021 (lose in match)
- 2021 (4 place)
- 2023 (5 place)
- 2025 (4 place)

== European Championship ==
- 2010 (3 place)
- 2012 (9 place)
- 2014 (9 place)
- 2016 (10 place)
- 2018 (8 place)
- 2022 (1 place)
- 2024 (3 place)

== Poland Championship (women) ==
- 2006 (2 place)
- 2009 (1 place)
- 2010 (2 place)
- 2011 (2 place)
- 2012 (2 place)
- 2013 (1 place)
- 2014 (1 place)
- 2015 (1 place)
- 2018 (3 place)
- 2020 (2 place)
- 2023 (3 place)
- 2024 (5 place)
- 2025 (1 place)

== Poland Championship (men) ==
- 2013 (6 place)
- 2014 (5 place)
- 2015 (3 place)
- 2017 (2 place)
- 2018 (1 place)
- 2019 (1 place)
- 2020 (2 place)
- 2023 (3 place)
- 2024 (1 place)
- 2025 (4 place)
