= Olga Kamyshleeva =

Dutch-Belarussian draughts player

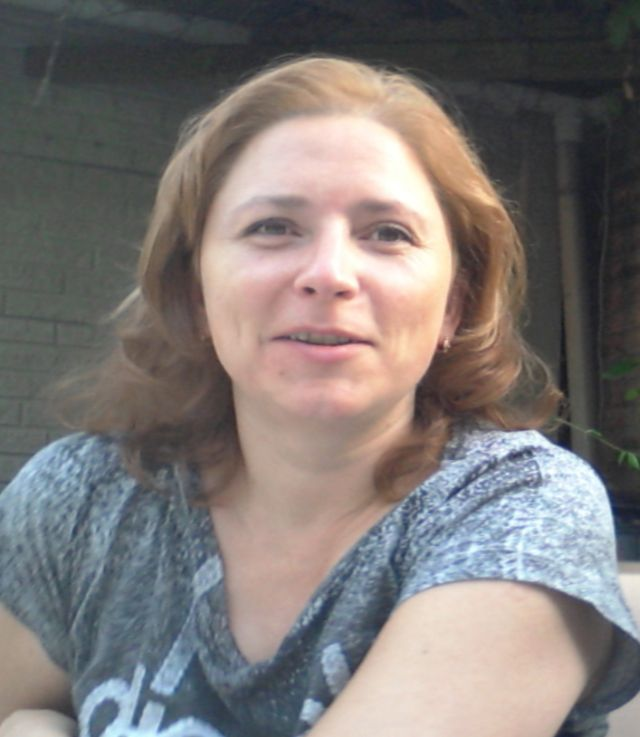
Olga Kamyshleeva in 2012

Olga Kamyshleeva (born 21 April 1973, Minsk) is a Dutch/Belarus international draughts player, 2003 Women's World Champion, she took silver in 1993 (shared with Elena Chitaykina from Russia) and bronze in 1997 and 2015. Then played World Draughts Championship match with Natalia Sadowska from Poland.

She emigrated to the Netherlands in 1996.

== Participation in World and European Championships ==
Year	Competition	Location	tournament/ match	Result	Place
1993	WC	(Netherlands) Brunssum	tournament	4+6=1-	2*
1997	WC	(Poland) Mińsk Mazowiecki	tournament	5+5=3-	3**
1999	WC	(Russia) Yakutsk	tournament (Swiss system)	3+6=0-	4
2000	EC	(Ukraine) Zaporizhia	tournament (Swiss system)	2+6=0-	3
2001	WC	(Netherlands) Velp	tournament (Swiss system)	3+5=1-	5
2002	EC	(Lithuania) Vilnius	tournament (Swiss system)	3+5=1-	7
2003	WC	(Netherlands) Zoutelande	tournament	6+7=0-	1
2004	WC	(Russia) Ufa	match with (Russia) Tamara Tansykkuzhina	1+2-	2
2015	WC	(China) Wǔhàn	tournament	5+10=0-	3
2016	WC	(Poland) Karpacz	match with (Poland) Natalia Sadowska	28:56	2

* took 2-3 place with (Russia) Elena Chitaykina

** took 2-3 place with (Poland) Ewa Schalley-Minkina, additional match 4:8
