= Natalia Fedorova =

Natalia Fedorova is a new media scholar, artist, and translator. Her works include avant-garde poetry, kinetic poetry, concrete poetry, hyperfiction, literary text generators and video poetry. Fedorova mainly focuses on electronic literature centered on Russia and how it functions in Russia. She is one of the most notable female contributors to electronic literature from Russia. She is the co-founder with Taras Mashtalir of the media poetry group Machine Libertine.

She also masterfully blends impressionism and realism, experimenting with mixed materials to delve into landscapes, still lifes, and existential themes.

== Education ==
Fedorova was born in 1981 and currently resides in Saint Petersburg, Russia.

She graduated with a PhD in literary theory from Herzen University in Saint Petersburg in October 2008. She also studied as a Fulbright scholar at Massachusetts Institute of Technology's Trope Tank with Nick Montfort. Before getting her PhD, she earned her MA and BA in European literature and also attended Kyungpook National University in Daegu, South Korea, studying Korean language and culture.

== Career ==
Fedorova worked as an associate professor at Saint Petersburg State University of Industrial Technologies and Design in the Department of Foreign Language from September 2006 to December 2012. She taught the courses Creative Writing with New Media, New Media in Contemporary Art, Practicum in Art Criticism, and Text in Visual Art.

She taught in the Curatorial Studies Program in Smolny College, St Petersburg, and in 2022, she returned as a visiting artist at Smolny beyond borders. Natalia has been a SPIRE guest researcher with the ELMCIP group at the University of Bergen (Norway).

== Works ==
Fedorova has created several electronic literature works, including 7, a hypertext piece with multiple endings. She co-wrote an interactive novel, Madam Ebaressa and a Butterfly, with Sergeij Kitov. She has also been a main contributor to several other works, most which were done in conjunction with Taras Mashtalir, a part of Machine Libertine ("Snow Queen", "Just Do Not Not Do It", "In Your Voice", "Machine Poetry Manifesto", "Whoever You Are"). Her audio and video poems appeared in Textsound, Rattapallax, LIT magazine, and Ill-Tempered Rubyist, räume für notizen | rooms for notes as well as number of international festivals (Moscow Book Festival, E-Poetry, LUMEN EX, Interrupt II, VideoBardo, Liberated Words, Tarp and others. She has also participated in net provs such as Thermophiles with Rob Wittig in 2022.

She has also written on topics in digital writing, electronic literature progression in Russia, and language. Fedorova has published studies on the challenges of translating electronic literature, such as her March 2014 essay The Ode to Translation or the Outcry Over the Untranslatable in the Electronic Book Review. She has also lectured on the subject at MIT in 2011.

She developed the Russian Electronic Literature Collection at the University of Bergen.

== Awards and grants ==
- Norsgender: Feminist Interdisciplinary Studies Program, Denmark (2007)
- NCCA: Nizhny Novgorod, Arsenal, Russia (2007)
- Fulbright Faculty Development Program: Postdoctoral research at MIT, Cambridge, Massachusetts (2011–2012)
- Spire: Postdoctoral research grant at University of Bergen, Norway (2013)
- Saint Petersburg State University, College of Liberal Arts and Sciences: Budget of "Notes On and After Conceptualism" (2014)
- Calvert 22 Foundation: 101 Festival, Poetics of Digital Technologies (2015)
- New Stage of Alexandrinsky Theatre, Leningrad Centre, Ground Gallery
- Short list for Kourekhin Prize (2014, 2016)
