= Vitalia Viktorovna Reshetnyak =

Soviet protozoologist and marine biologist

Vitalia Viktorovna Reshetnyak (Решетняк) (1925–2015) was a Soviet protozoologist and marine biologist, specialising in Radiolaria, Phaeodorea and Acantharea.

Reshetnyak was born on May 10, 1925, in the province of Voronezh. In 1948 she graduated from the Leningrad State University Her supervisor was Valentin Aleksandrovich Dogel. She worked at the Zoological Institute of the USSR Academy of Sciences from 1949 until she was made redundant on 1 April 1982. She defended her thesis in 1956, and a volume of the same name was published in 1966 as part of the series Fauna of the USSR. This work described for the first time vertical distribution of deep-sea Radiolaria and Phaeodorea in the Kuril-Kamchatka trough. She made a significant contribution to the study of the morphology and systematics of Phaeodorea. Together with A.A. Strelkov she summarized the data on the colonial radiolaria, the Collodaria. She wrote a monograph on the Acantharea of the world's oceans, considering them an independent order. Reshetnyak described more than 20 new species for science, and established a new family of Phaeodorea, Polypyramidae Reschetnjak, 1966. She was the author and co-author of more than 50 scientific papers, including two monographs.

Reshetnyak died in St Petersburg in 2015.

== Selected Russian language publications ==
- 1966: Deep-sea Radiolaria of the Phaeodaria of the northwestern part of the Pacific Ocean.
- 1971: (With A. A. Strelkov) The Collodarian radiolaria (Spumellaria mikrovogo) of the oceans.
- 1981: Acanthariea (Protozoa) of the world's oceans.
