= Nikolai Bushuev =

Russian professional ice hockey forward

- Born: March 14, 1985 (age 40); Izhevsk, Russian SFSR, Soviet Union
- Height: 6 ft 1 in (185 cm)
- Weight: 194 lb (88 kg; 13 st 12 lb)
- Position: Forward
- Shot: Left
- Played for: Avtomobilist Yekaterinburg; SKA Saint Petersburg; HC Spartak Moscow; Severstal Cherepovets
- NHL draft: Undrafted
- Playing career: 2004–2014

Nikolai Bushuev (born March 14, 1985) is a former Russian professional ice hockey forward who played in the Kontinental Hockey League (KHL).
