= Vitalia Doumesh =

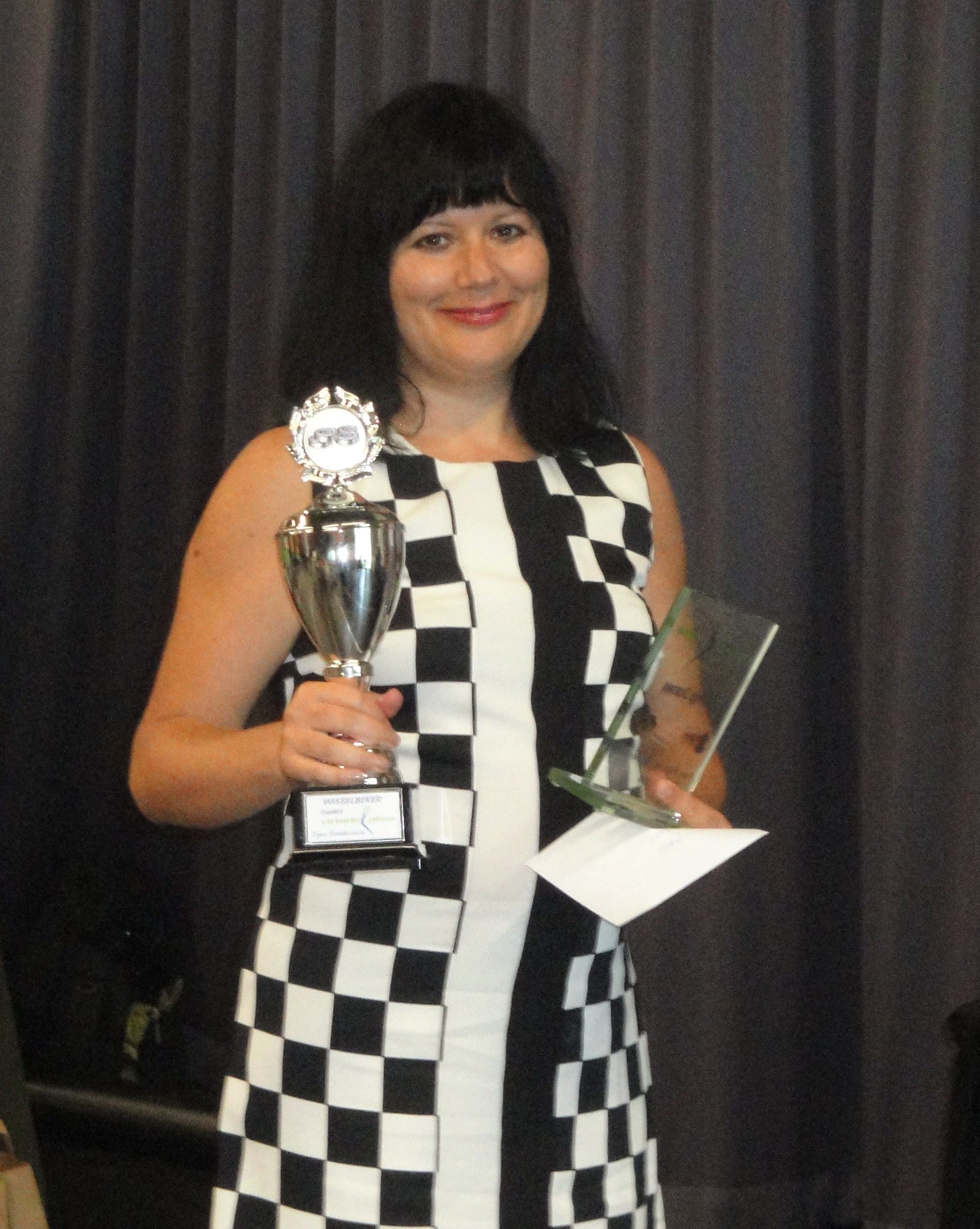
- Born: Vitālija Dumeša; April 29, 1965 (age 60); Latvian SSR, USSR
- Citizenship: Netherlands

Vitalia Doumesh (Latvian: Vitālija Dumeša; born April 29, 1965, in Latvian SSR, USSR) is a Dutch draughts player (International draughts, English draughts and Turkish draughts). She won championships in the USSR (1983, 1989, 1990, 1991) and the Netherlands (1997, 2015, 2017). Women's International grandmaster (GMIF).

== Biography ==
Doumesh lived and worked as a software engineer in Latvian capital Riga during the 80s . Since 1995 she has lived in the Netherlands (Alkmaar), She is a teacher at Transcendental Meditation, translator from Dutch, Russian and English.

== International draughts ==
=== World Championship ===
- 1997 (6 place))
- 1999 (15 place)
- 2003 (7 place)
- 2005 (7 place)
- 2007 (11 place)
- 2011 (11 place)
- 2017 (7 place)
- 2023 (10 place)

=== European Championship ===
- 2002 (4 place)
- 2004 (12 place)
- 2006 (9 place)
- 2008 (13 place)
- 2000 (8 place)
- 2012 (23 place)
- 2014 (15 place)
- 2016 (14 place)
- 2018 (10 place)
- 2022 (12 place)
- 2024 (15 place)

== English draughts ==
=== World Championship ===
- 2013 (4 place)
- 2014 (2 place)
- 2016 (5 place)
- 2025 (5 place)

== Turkish draughts ==
=== World Championship ===
- 2014 (35 place and 3 place in the team classification)
