= Ekaterina Bushueva =

Russian draughts player (1962–2011)

Personal information
- Full name: Екатерина Николаевна Бушуева
- Born: August 12, 1962 (age 63) Moscow, USSR
- Died: 17.12.2011 Moscow, Russia

Sport
- Country: Russia
- Sport: Russian draughts
- Now coaching: S. V. Bushuev, Alexander Schwarzman

Achievements and titles
- World finals: 1993 World Draughts-64 Championships — Gold; 1997 World Draughts-64 Championships — Gold; 1996 World Draughts-64 Championships — Silver; 1999 World Draughts-64 Championships — Silver
- Regional finals: 2006 European Draughts-64 Championships — Gold; 2010 European Draughts-64 Championships — Bronze
- National finals: 2000 — 2005, 2007 — Gold

Ekaterina Bushueva (Russian: Екатерина Николаевна Бушуева; December 8, 1962 – December 17, 2011) was a Russian draughts player. She has won the Women's World Draughts-64 Championship two times, won Women's Draughts-64 European Championship. Many times champion of Russia, International grandmaster in Russian draughts (since 1994).

From 1984 to 1991, she has six medals Draughts Championship of the USSR. Her every competitions in World and European Championship was with medal. Ekaterina Bushueva died at 49 years old after serious disease.
