= 2016 Women's World Draughts Championship match =

Draughts match between Natalia Sadowska and Olga Kamyshleeva

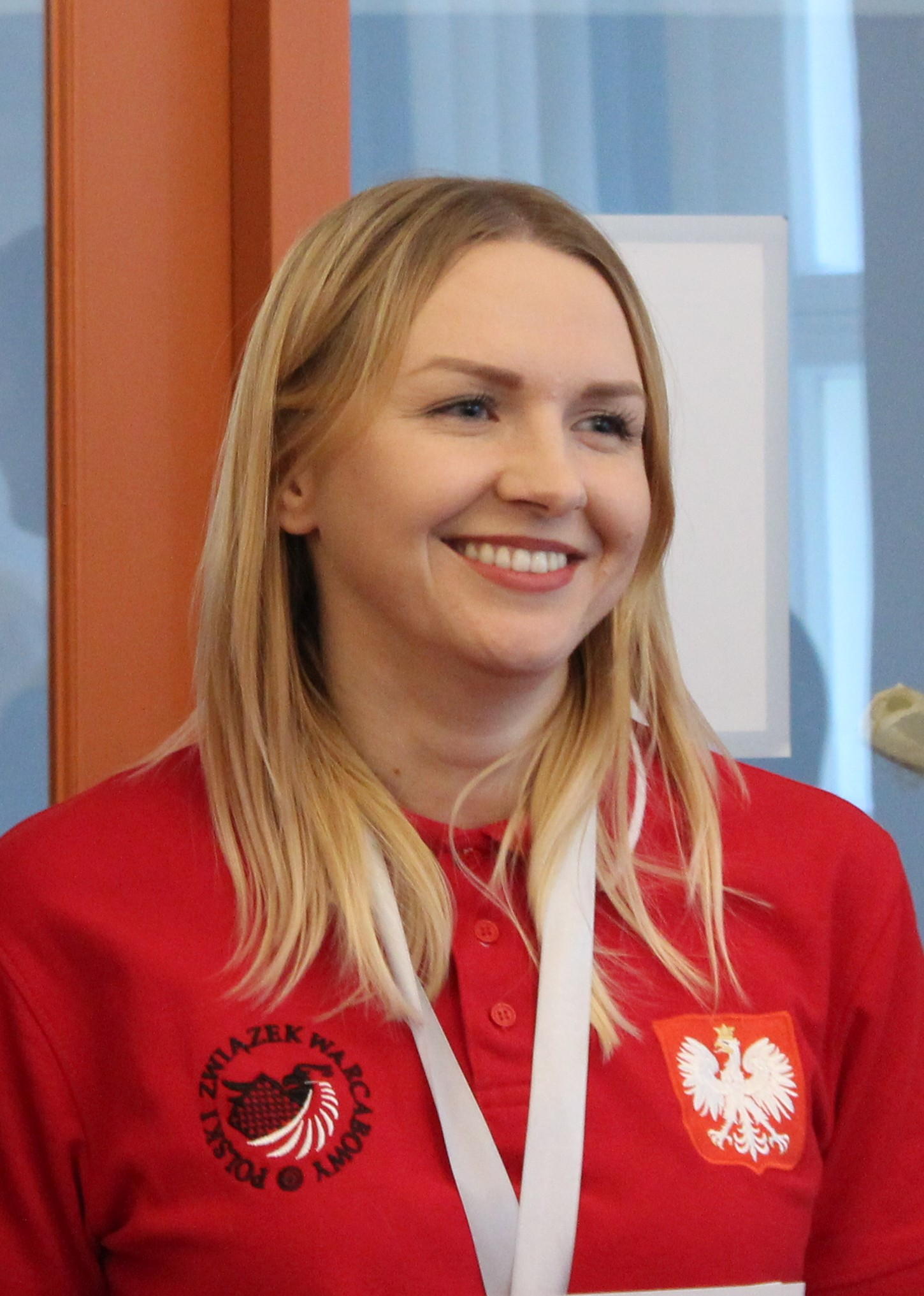
- 2016 Women's World Draughts Champion Natalia Sadowska

Tournament information
- Location: Karpacz, Poland
- Dates: 2 September–9 September
- Administrator: FMJD
- Tournament format: Match

Final positions
- Champion: Natalia Sadowska

The 2016 Women's World Draughts Championship match in international draughts was held from 2–9 September 2016 in Karpacz, Poland. It was held under the auspices of the International Draughts Federation (FMJD). It was played between the second-place finisher at the 2015 Women's World Draughts Championship, Natalia Sadowska (Poland), and the third-place finisher, Olga Kamyshleeva (Netherlands). The world champion at the time, Zoja Golubeva (Latvia), had informed FMJD that she was not willing to defend her title. Natalia Sadowska won and became the 9th women's world draughts champion.

== Rules ==
The match consisted of 9 micro-matches.

The first game of each micro-match was a standard game: 80 minutes plus a 1-minute increment per move. A victory earned 12 points, while a loss earned 0.

If the standard game was drawn, a rapid game was played: 20 minutes plus a 5-second increment per move. A victory earned 8 points, while a loss earned 4.

If the rapid game was drawn, a blitz game was played: 5 minutes plus a 3-second increment per move. A victory earned 7 points, while a loss earned 5.

If the blitz game was drawn, each player was awarded 6 points.

A player won the championship by scoring more than 54 points. If the score was tied after 9 micro-matches, the title would go to the player with the better score in the standard games. If that was equal, the title would go to the player with the better score in rapid games. If the tie still persisted, a deciding tie-break would be played.

The deciding tie-break was scheduled to consist of super-blitz games, best of three, with a time control of 5 minutes plus a 2-second increment per move, with additional games to be played if necessary until a decisive result.

== Results ==
Name	Country	Round 1	Round 2	Round 3	Round 4	Round 5	Round 6	Round 7	Round 8	Round 9	Total score
Natalia Sadowska	Poland	12	6	12	7	7	6	6			56
Olga Kamyshleeva	Netherlands	0	6	0	5	5	6	6			28

== See also ==
- List of women's Draughts World Championship winners
- Women's World Draughts Championship
