= Bushuyev cattle =

Breed of cattle

Bushuyev cattle (Russian: Бушуевская, romanized: Bushuyevskaya) is a cattle breed from Uzbekistan. They originated from cross breeding indigenous zebu cattles with western European dairy breeds. They are white coated with black spots, black ears and rims around eyes, and a black band around the muzzle.
