= Olena Korotka =

Ukrainian draughts player

Personal information
- Nationality: Ukraine
- Born: October 2, 1983 (age 42) Dnepropetrovsk, Ukrainian SSR

Sport
- Sport: Draughts
- Team: Ukraine
Medal record
Representing Ukraine
Draughts
World Draughts-64 championships
| Gold medal – first place | Izmir 2018 | Brazilian draughts |
| Gold medal – first place | Nizhnevartovsk 2018 | Russian draughts |
Women's World Draughts Championship
| Bronze medal – third place | Willemstad 2023 | International draughts |

Olena Korotka (Ukrainian: Оле́на Ві́кторівна Коро́тка, Russian: Елена Викторовна Короткая; b. October 2, 1983 in Dnepropetrovsk, Ukrainian SSR) is a draughts player in Brazilian and Russian draughts from Ukraine, world champion in 2018 in both variants, European champion 2016 in Russian draughts (blits). Many times champion of Ukraine. Olena Korotka is Women's International grandmaster (GMIF) since 2016.

From 2001 Lived in Kamianske. Member of the Presidium of the Dnipro City Drafts Federation since 2010. The judge of the first category in draughts.
