= Yulia Makarenkova =

Ukrainian draughts player (born 1973)

Personal information
- Full name: Yulia Vladimirovna Makarenkova
- Nationality: Ukraine
- Born: Yulia Weinstein; September 2, 1973 (age 52) Kyiv, Ukraine

Sport
- Country: Ukraine
- Sport: Draughts
- Event(s): Russian checkers Brazilian draughts
- Turned pro: 1982
- Coached by: V. A. Shalimov

Achievements and titles
- World finals: Russian: champion (1994, 1999, 2009); Brazilian: 3rd (2007)
- Regional finals: Europe: champion (2002, 2007)
- National finals: USSR: champion (1988, 1990); Ukraine: champion (8 times Russian, 2 times International)

Yulia Vladimirovna Makarenkova (Ukrainian: Юлiя Вoлoдимировна Макаренкова, Russian: Юлия Владимировна Макаренкова; born September 2, 1973 in Kyiv, Ukrainian SSR) is a draughts player from Ukraine and International Grand Master (GMI). She specializes in Russian checkers and Brazilian draughts played on a small board but also takes part in competitions in International draughts. Yulia Makarenkova is a three-times World champion and two-times European champion in Russian checkers, two-times national champion of the Soviet Union and multiple times Ukrainian national champion in Russian checkers and International draughts.

== Personal ==
Yulia Weinstein was born in Kyiv and in 1996 graduated from the National University of Kyiv. She first met her future husband Valeriy Makarenkov at the World championships in Alushta in 2000. The couple with two children currently lives in Kharkiv.

== Sports career ==
=== Draughts-64 ===
Yulia Weinstein was introduced to draughts when she was four years old. When she was in the third grade, in late 1982, she started training seriously under the guidance of Mikhail Litvinenko. In 1984, Weinstein won her first meaningful title when she became the champion of Kyiv among U-18 girls. During the tournament, she defeated some of the girls who were two levels higher than her in the Soviet sporting rankings.

In 1988, Makarenkova became the youngest Soviet champion in Russian checkers, winning the national championships at the age of 15. In 1989, she became the champion of the Ukrainian SSR, and in 1990 won the Soviet championship for the second time.

Starting from 1993, Makarenkova regularly took part in the World championships in Russian checkers, organized both by the leading international organization, FMJD, and the alternative International Association of Russian Checkers (Russian: Международная ассоциация русских шашек, МАРШ). She won the FMJD World championships three times, in 1994, 1999 and 2009, and was a medalist multiple times. In 2007 at the first World Women Championships in Brazilian draughts, Makarenkova won a bronze medal. In addition, she is two-time European champion in Russian checkers (in 2002 and 2007), also winning medals in 2004 and 2006. In addition, she won the world championship (Russian checkers) in rapid draughts and blitz in 2003.

During the period of national independence, starting 1992, Yulia Makarenkova (Weinstein) won the Ukrainian national championships in Russian checkers seven times (1992, 1993, 1997–1999, 2007 and 2008) and became six-time silver medalist and two-times bronze medalist.

==== Record in World and European championships in Russian and Brazilian variants ====
| Year | Competition | Place | Tournament / match | Result | Place |
|---|---|---|---|---|---|
| 1993 | WC | (Ukraine) Kerch | Tournament | 5/8 | 2 |
| 1993 | WC (MARSH) | (Russia) Oryol | Tournament | | 3 |
| 1994 | WC | (Ukraine) Alushta | Tournament | 21/32 | 1 |
| 1994 | WC (MARSH) | (Russia) Yakutsk | Tournament | 12.5/17 | 2 |
| 1996 | WC | (Ukraine) Alushta | Tournament | | 3 |
| 1999 | WC | (Ukraine) Simferopol | Tournament | 22/28 | 1 |
| 2001 | WC | (Ukraine) Alushta | Tournament | 19/26 | 2 |
| 2003 | WC | (Russia) Saint Petersburg | Tournament | 19/28 | 2^{1} |
| 2002 | EC | (Ukraine) Dnipropetrovsk | Tournament | | 1 |
| 2004 | EC | (Russia) Kaluga | Tournament | | 3 |
| 2006 | EC | (Germany) Saarbrücken | Tournament (Swiss+PO) | +3=5-1^{2} | 2 |
| 2007 | WC (Brazilian) | (Poland) Nidzica | Tournament | +5=5-1 | 3^{3} |
| 2007 | EC | (Ukraine) Lviv | Tournament | +8=3-0 | 1 |
| 2007 | WC (MARSH) | (Abkhazia) Pitsunda | Tournament | 9/13 | 2 |
| 2008 | WMSG | (China) Beijing | Tournament (Swiss+PO) | +2=7-1 | 4^{4} |
| 2008 | EC | (Russia) Kargopol | Турнир (Swiss+PO) | +3=3-3^{5} | 4 |
| 2009 | WC | (Ukraine) Rubizhne | Tournament (Swiss+RR) | +6=8-0^{6} | 1 |
| 2010 | EC | (Bulgaria) Sunny Beach | Tournament (Swiss) | +2=6-1 | 7 |

^{1} Lost to (Russia) Antonina Langina 2-4 in a 1st place barrage
^{2} +3=4-0 in Swiss tournament, drew in semifinal against (Ukraine) Viktoriya Motrichko, lost in the final to (Russia) Elena Bushueva
^{3} By the results of an additional round robin tournament took part in a 3rd place barrage and defeated (Russia) Stepanida Kirillina
^{4} +2=5-0 in Swiss tournament, lost in semifinal to (Moldova) Elena Miskova, in a 3rd place barrage drew against (Moldova) Yuliya Romanskaya and lost the bronze medal based on ranking
^{5} +3=3-1 in Swiss tournament, lost in semifinal to (Russia) Yulia Kuzina and in the 3rd place barrage to (Belarus) Daria Fedorovich
^{6} +2=5-0 in Swiss tournament, +4-3=0 in the final round robin

=== International draughts ===
Although small board draughts remain the primary specialization field for Makarenkova, she also participates in national and international competitions in International draughts. She won the national championships in International draughts twice (in 1999 and 2009) and was a medalist several times.

The best result by Makarenkova in international competitions was sharing the 4th place at the World championship in Bamako (Mali) after winning 4 games, drawing 7 and losing 2. She also took part in 1997 and 1999 World championships and in 2008 and 2010 European championships with less success. She was a member in the Ukrainian national team in the 2010 European team championships.

== External sources ==
- Yulia Vladimirovna Makarenkova (Weinstein) at the website of the academy for chess and draughts arts (in Russian)
- Profile at the Tournament base of the Dutch Draughts Federation
