= 2016 in sports =

2016 in sports describes the year's events in world sport. The main highlight for this year is the 2016 Olympic and Paralympic Games in Rio de Janeiro. The year is considered by many to be the greatest year in sports history, featuring many underdog stories, huge comebacks, broken curses and exciting and historic moments.

== Calendar by month ==
- January
- February
- March
- April
- May
- June
- July
- August
- September
- October
- November
- December

== American football ==
- Super Bowl 50 – the Denver Broncos (AFC) won 24–10 over the Carolina Panthers (NFC)
  - Location: Levi's Stadium
  - Attendance: 71,088
  - MVP: Von Miller, LB (Denver)

== Archery ==
- November 21, 2015 – September 17, 2016: 2015–16 World Archery Federation Events Page

=== 2016 Summer Olympics (WA) ===
- August 5 – 12: 2016 Summer Olympics in (Brazil) Rio de Janeiro at the Sambadrome Marquês de Sapucaí
  - Men's individual: (gold) (South Korea) Ku Bon-chan; (silver) (France) Jean-Charles Valladont; (bronze) (United States) Brady Ellison
  - Men's team: (gold) South Korea; (silver) United States; (bronze) Australia
  - Women's individual: (gold) (South Korea) Chang Hye-jin; (silver) (Germany) Lisa Unruh; (bronze) (South Korea) Ki Bo-bae
  - Women's team: (gold) South Korea; (silver) Russia; (bronze) Chinese Taipei

=== Indoor archery ===
- November 21 & 22, 2015: IA World Cup #1 in (Morocco) Marrakesh (junior & senior individual events)
  - Ireland and Italy won 2 gold medals each. France won the overall medal tally.
- December 9 & 10, 2015: IA World Cup #2 in (Thailand) Bangkok (senior individual events only)
  - Men's recurve winner: (United States) Brady Ellison
  - Women's recurve winner: (Mexico) Aída Román
  - Men's compound winner: (United States) Reo Wilde
  - Women's compound winner: (Slovenia) Toja Cerne
- January 15 – 17: IA World Cup #3 in Nîmes (junior & senior individual events)
  - Men's recurve winner: (Italy) Luca Melotto
  - Women's recurve winner: (Italy) Guendalina Sartori
  - Men's compound winner: (United States) Braden Gellenthien
  - Women's compound winner: (Mexico) Linda Ochoa-Anderson
  - Italy and France won 2 gold medals each. Italy won the overall medal tally.
- January 29 – 31: IA World Cup #4 (final) in (United States) Las Vegas
  - Men's recurve winner: (United States) Brady Ellison
  - Women's recurve winner: (United States) Khatuna Lorig
  - Men's compound winner: (United States) Jesse Broadwater
  - Women's compound winner: (Denmark) Sarah Holst Sonnichsen
- March 1 – 6: 2016 World Indoor Archery Championships in (Turkey) Ankara
  - Italy won both the gold and overall medal tallies.

=== Outdoor archery ===
- January 28 – 31: 2016 African Archery Championships in (Namibia) Windhoek
  - Egypt won both the gold and overall medal tallies.
- April 26 – May 1: WA World Cup #1 in (China) Shanghai
  - Men's recurve winner: (Netherlands) Sjef van den Berg
  - Women's recurve winner: (South Korea) JU Hye-bhin
  - Men's compound winner: (Netherlands) Mike Schloesser
  - Women's compound winner: (Colombia) Sara López
- May 9 – 15: WA World Cup #2 in (Colombia) Medellín
  - Men's recurve winner: (United States) Brady Ellison
  - Women's recurve winner: (South Korea) Choi Mi-sun
  - Men's compound winner: (Italy) Sergio Pagni
  - Women's compound winner: (Colombia) Sara López
- May 23 – 29: 2016 European Archery Championships in (United Kingdom) Nottingham
  - Men's recurve winner: (France) Jean-Charles Valladont
  - Women's recurve winner: (Ukraine) Veronika Marchenko
  - Men's compound winner: (Denmark) Stephan Hansen
  - Women's compound winner: (Belgium) Sarah Prieels
- June 1 – 5: World University Archery Championship in (Mongolia) Ulaanbaatar
  - Men's recurve winner: (Russia) Galsan Bazarzhapov
  - Women's recurve winner: (South Korea) Kang Chae-young
  - Men's compound winner: (South Korea) Kim Jong-ho
  - Women's compound winner: (South Korea) Ko Soyoung
- June 13 – 19: WA World Cup #3 in (Turkey) Antalya
  - Men's recurve winner: (South Korea) Lee Seung-yun
  - Women's recurve winner: (South Korea) Choi Mi-sun
  - Men's compound winner: (Turkey) Evren Çağıran
  - Women's compound winner: (Colombia) Sara López
- September 24 & 25: WA World Cup #4 (final) in Odense
  - Men's recurve winner: (United States) Brady Ellison
  - Women's recurve winner: (South Korea) Ki Bo-bae
  - Men's compound winner: (Netherlands) Mike Schloesser
  - Women's compound winner: (Italy) Marcella Tonioli
  - Mixed team recurve winners: South Korea
  - Mixed team compound winners: Denmark
- September 27 – October 2: 2016 World Archery Field Championships in (Republic of Ireland) Dublin
  - Italy and the United States won 5 gold medals each. Italy won the overall medal tally.

== Baseball ==
=== Major League Baseball ===
- April 3 – October 2: 2016 Major League Baseball season
  - American League winner: (Ohio) Cleveland Indians
  - National League winner: (Illinois) Chicago Cubs
- June 9 – 11: 2016 Major League Baseball draft in Secaucus, New Jersey
  - #1 pick: (California) Mickey Moniak to the (Pennsylvania) Philadelphia Phillies from (California) La Costa Canyon High School
- July 12: 2016 Major League Baseball All-Star Game in (California) San Diego at Petco Park
  - Winners: American League
  - MVP: (Florida) Eric Hosmer ( (Missouri) Kansas City Royals)
  - Home Run Derby: (California) Giancarlo Stanton ( (Florida) Miami Marlins)
- October 25 – November 2: 2016 World Series
  - The (Illinois) Chicago Cubs defeated the (Ohio) Cleveland Indians, 4–3 in games played, to win their third World Series title. Notably, this ended the longest championship drought in the history of North American sports at 108 years.

=== WBSC ===
- July 29 – August 7: 2016 WBSC 15U Baseball World Cup in Iwaki, Fukushima
  - Cuba defeated Japan, 9–4, to win their second consecutive and sixth overall WBSC 15U Baseball World Cup title.
  - The United States took the bronze medal.
- September 3 – 11: 2016 Women's Baseball World Cup in (South Korea) Gijang County (Busan)
  - Japan defeated Canada, 10–0, to win their fifth consecutive Women's Baseball World Cup title.
  - Venezuela took the bronze medal.
- October 28 – November 6: 2016 23U Baseball World Cup in (Mexico) Monterrey (replaces the 21U Baseball World Cup)
  - Japan defeated Australia, 10–3, to win their first 23U Baseball World Cup title.
  - South Korea took the bronze medal.

=== Little League Baseball ===
- July 26 – August 2: 2016 Big League World Series in Easley, South Carolina
  - (Chinese Taipei) Tao-Yuan County Big LL (Team Asia-Pacific) defeated (Hawaii) Kihei LL (Team West), 6–2, in the final.
- July 31 – August 6: 2016 Senior League World Series in Bangor, Maine
  - (Illinois) Clear Ridge LL (Team Central) defeated (Australia) Southern Mariners LL (Team Asia-Pacific), 7–2, in the final.
- July 31 – August 7: 2016 Little League Intermediate (50/70) World Series in Livermore, California
  - (Hawaii) Central East Maui LL (Team West) defeated (South Korea) West Seoul LL (Team Asia-Pacific), 5–1, in the final.
- August 14 – 21: 2016 Junior League World Series in Taylor, Michigan
  - (Chinese Taipei) Shing-Ming Junior LL (Team Asia-Pacific) defeated (Hawaii) Kawaihau Community LL (Team West), 9–1, in the final.
- August 18 – 28: 2016 Little League World Series in South Williamsport, Pennsylvania
  - (New York (state)) Maine-Endwell Little League (Team Mid-Atlantic) defeated (South Korea) East Seoul Little League (Team Asia-Pacific and Middle East), 2–1, in the final.

== Basketball ==
=== 2016 Summer Olympics (FIBA) ===
- January 15 – 17: Aquece Rio International Women's Basketball Tournament in Rio de Janeiro (Olympic Test Event)
  - Overall, Australia defeated Brazil in the final standings. Argentina took the bronze medal.
- August 6 – 21: 2016 Summer Olympics in (Brazil) Rio de Janeiro at the Olympic Training Center
  - Men: (gold) United States; (silver) Serbia; (bronze) Spain
  - Women: (gold) United States; (silver) Spain; (bronze) Serbia

=== International FIBA championships ===
- June 1 – 5: 2016 FIBA 3x3 Under-18 World Championships in (Kazakhstan) Astana
  - Men: Qatar defeated Brazil, 20–12, in the final. Italy took the bronze medal.
  - Women: France defeated the United States, 21–12, in the final. Spain took the bronze medal.
- June 13 – 19: 2016 FIBA World Olympic Qualifying Tournament for Women in Nantes
  - France, Spain, Turkey, China, and Belarus all qualified to compete at Rio 2016.
- June 22 – July 3: 2016 FIBA Under-17 World Championship for Men and Women in (Spain) Zaragoza
  - Men: The United States defeated Turkey, 96–56, to win their fourth consecutive FIBA Under-17 World Championship title.
  - Lithuania took third place.
  - Women: Australia defeated Italy, 62–38, to win their first FIBA Under-17 World Championship for Women title.
  - The United States took third place.
- July 4 – 9: FIBA Men's Olympic Qualifying Tournament #1 in (Italy) Turin
  - Croatia has qualified to compete at Rio 2016.
- July 4 – 9: FIBA Men's Olympic Qualifying Tournament #2 in Belgrade
  - Serbia has qualified to compete at Rio 2016.
- July 5 – 10: FIBA Men's Olympic Qualifying Tournament #3 in (Philippines) Manila
  - France has qualified to compete at Rio 2016.
- August 6 & 7: 2016 FIBA 3x3 Open Pacific Championships in (Australia) Gold Coast, Queensland
  - Guam defeated (Australia) NSW, 11–9, in the final.
- October 11 – 15: 2016 FIBA 3x3 World Championships in (China) Guangzhou
  - Men: Serbia defeated the United States, 21–16, in the final. Slovenia took third place.
  - Women: The Czech Republic defeated Ukraine, 21–11, in the final. The United States took third place.

=== NBA ===
- October 27, 2015 – April 13, 2016: 2015–16 NBA season
  - Top regular season team: (California) Golden State Warriors
  - MVP: (North Carolina) Stephen Curry ( (California) Golden State Warriors)
- February 14: 2016 NBA All-Star Game at the Air Canada Centre in Toronto
  - Note: This NBA All-Star Game was held outside the United States for the first time.
  - The Western Conference (NBA) defeat the Eastern Conference (NBA) 196–173.
  - MVP: (California) Russell Westbrook ( Oklahoma City Thunder)
  - NBA All-Star Celebrity Game: Team Canada defeated Team United States 74–64.
  - Rising Stars Challenge: Team USA defeated Team (United Nations) World 157–154.
  - NBA All-Star Weekend Skills Challenge winner: (New Jersey) Karl-Anthony Towns ( Minnesota Timberwolves)
  - Three-Point Contest winner: (California) Klay Thompson ( (California) Golden State Warriors)
  - Slam Dunk Contest winner: (Washington (state)) Zach LaVine ( Minnesota Timberwolves)
- April 16 – June 19: 2016 NBA Playoffs
  - The (Ohio) Cleveland Cavaliers defeated the (California) Golden State Warriors, 4–3 in games played, to win their first NBA title.
  - MVP: (Ohio) LeBron James (Cleveland Cavaliers)
- June 23: 2016 NBA draft at the Barclays Center in Brooklyn (New York City)
  - #1 pick: (Australia) Ben Simmons to the (Pennsylvania) Philadelphia 76ers from (Louisiana) LSU

=== WNBA ===
- April 14: 2016 WNBA draft at the Mohegan Sun Arena in Uncasville, Connecticut
  - #1: (New York (state)) Breanna Stewart, from the Connecticut Huskies, to the (Washington (state)) Seattle Storm
- May 14 – September 18: 2016 WNBA season
  - Eastern Conference Winners: (New York (state)) New York Liberty
  - Western Conference Winners: Minnesota Lynx
- September 21 – October 20: 2016 WNBA Playoffs
  - The (California) Los Angeles Sparks defeated the Minnesota Lynx, 3–2 in games played, to win their third WNBA championship title.

=== NCAA ===
- March 15 – April 4: 2016 NCAA Men's Division I Basketball Tournament (Final four at NRG Stadium in Houston)
  - The (Pennsylvania) Villanova Wildcats defeated the North Carolina Tar Heels, 77–74, to win their second NCAA Men's Division I Basketball title.
    - Most Outstanding Player: (Pennsylvania) Ryan Arcidiacono (Villanova)
- March 19 – April 5: 2016 NCAA Women's Division I Basketball Tournament (Final four at Bankers Life Fieldhouse in Indianapolis)
  - The Connecticut Huskies defeated the (New York (state)) Syracuse Orange, 82–51, to win their fourth consecutive and 11th overall NCAA Women's Division I Basketball Tournament title. The title was also the 11th for Huskies head coach Geno Auriemma, putting him ahead of John Wooden for the most Division I national titles for a head coach in either men's or women's basketball.
    - Most Outstanding Player: (New York (state)) Breanna Stewart (Connecticut)

=== FIBA Americas ===
- January 15 – March 12: 2016 FIBA Americas League
  - (Venezuela) Guaros de Lara defeated (Brazil) Bauru, 84–79, to win their first FIBA Americas League title. (Brazil) Mogi das Cruzes took third place.
- May 20 – 26: 2016 South American Basketball Championship for Women in Barquisimeto
  - Brazil defeated Venezuela, 94–75, to win their 16th consecutive and 26th overall South American Basketball Championship for Women title. Colombia took the bronze medal.
- June 19 – 25: 2016 Centrobasket in Panama City
  - Puerto Rico defeated Mexico, 84–83, to win their 11th Centrobasket title. Dominican Republic took third place.
- June 26 – July 2: 2016 South American Basketball Championship for Men in Caracas
  - Venezuela defeated Brazil, 64–58, to win their second consecutive and third overall South American Basketball Championship title.
  - Uruguay took third place.
- July 3 – 16: 2016 CBC U16 Championship in Georgetown, Guyana
  - Men: The Bahamas defeated Guyana, 84–57, to win the inaugural FIBA CBC U16 Championship title. Jamaica took third place.
  - Women: The Bahamas defeated Suriname, 55–50, to win the inaugural Women's FIBA CBC U16 Championship title. British Virgin Islands took third place.
- July 13 – 23: 2016 FIBA Americas Under-18 Championship for Men and Women in (Chile) Valdivia
  - Men: The United States defeated Canada, 99–84, to win their fourth consecutive and eighth overall FIBA Americas Under-18 Championship title.
  - Brazil took third place.
  - Women: The United States defeated Canada, 109–62, to win their eighth consecutive and ninth overall FIBA Americas Under-18 Championship title.
  - Brazil took third place.
- August 24 – 28: 2016 Centrobasket U15 Championship in Patillas, Puerto Rico
  - Puerto Rico defeated the Dominican Republic, 74–67, in the final. Mexico took third place.
- August 29 – September 2: 2016 COCABA U16 Championship for Men and Women in San José, Costa Rica
  - Men: 1. Mexico; 2. Panama; 3. El Salvador
  - Women: 1. Mexico; 2. El Salvador; 3. Costa Rica
- September 20 – December 7: 2016 South American League for Men's Clubs in (Argentina) Comodoro Rivadavia and La Banda, (Chile) Valdivia, and (Venezuela) Barquisimeto
  - (Brazil) Mogi das Cruzes defeated (Argentina) Weber Bahía, 3–0 in games played, in the final.
- October 25 – 29: 2016 South American U15 Championship for Men in Asunción
  - Argentina defeated Paraguay, 69–60, in the final. Venezuela took third place.
- November 16 – 20: 2016 FIBA South America Under-15 Championship for Women in (Ecuador) Guayaquil
  - Argentina defeated Venezuela, 65–54, to win their sixth FIBA South America Under-15 Championship for Women title.
  - Colombia took third place.

=== FIBA Europe ===
- October 5, 2015 – May 15, 2016: 2015–16 Euroleague
  - (Russia) CSKA Moscow defeated (Turkey) Fenerbahçe, 101–96 in overtime, to win their seventh Euroleague title. (Russia) Lokomotiv Kuban took third place.
- October 7, 2015 – April 13, 2016: 2015–16 EuroCup Women
  - (France) CJM Bourges Basket defeated fellow French team, ESB Villeneuve-d'Ascq, 105–93 in two matches, to win their first EuroCup Women title.
- October 13, 2015 – April 27, 2016: 2015–16 Eurocup Basketball
  - (Turkey) Galatasaray Odeabank defeated (France) Strasbourg IG, 140–133 on aggregate, to win their first Eurocup Basketball title.
- October 14, 2015 – April 17, 2016: 2015–16 EuroLeague Women
  - (Russia) UMMC Ekaterinburg defeated fellow Russian team, Nadezhda Orenburg, 72–69, to win their third EuroLeague Women title. (Turkey) Fenerbahçe took third place.
- October 21, 2015 – May 1, 2016: 2015–16 FIBA Europe Cup (debut event and replaced the EuroChallenge)
  - (Germany) Skyliners Frankfurt defeated (Italy) Pallacanestro Varese, 66–62, to win the inaugural FIBA Europe Cup title. (France) Élan Chalon took third place.
- June 26 – July 3: 2016 FIBA European Championship for Small Countries in (Moldova) Chișinău
  - Armenia defeated Andorra, 79–71, to win their first FIBA European Championship for Small Countries title.
  - San Marino took third place.
- June 28 – July 3: 2016 FIBA Women's European Championship for Small Countries in Gibraltar
  - Malta defeated Ireland, 67–59, to win their third FIBA Women's European Championship for Small Countries title.
  - Moldova took third place.
- July 9 – 17: 2016 FIBA Europe Under-20 Championship for Women in (Portugal) Matosinhos
  - Spain defeated Italy, 71–69, to win their second consecutive and sixth overall FIBA Europe Under-20 Championship for Women title.
  - Russia took third place.
- July 16 – 24: 2016 FIBA Europe Under-20 Championship in (Finland) Helsinki
  - Spain defeated Lithuania, 68–55, to win their second FIBA Europe Under-20 Championship title.
  - Turkey took third place.
- July 23 – 31: 2016 FIBA Europe Under-18 Championship for Women in (Hungary) Sopron
  - France defeated Spain, 74–44, to win their second FIBA Europe Under-18 Championship for Women title.
  - Russia took third place.
- August 6 – 14: 2016 FIBA Europe Under-16 Championship for Women in (Italy) Udine
  - Spain defeated Germany, 64–48, to win their tenth FIBA Europe Under-16 Championship for Women title.
  - France took third place.
- August 12 – 20: 2016 FIBA Europe Under-16 Championship in (Poland) Radom
  - Spain defeated Lithuania, 74–72, to win their fourth FIBA Europe Under-16 Championship title.
  - Turkey took third place.
- September 2 – 4: 2016 FIBA 3x3 European Championships in Bucharest
  - Men: Slovenia defeated Serbia 19–17, to win their first FIBA 3x3 European Championships title. The Netherlands took third place.
  - Women: Hungary defeated Romania, 21–14, to win their first FIBA Women's 3x3 European Championships title. Russia took third place.
- September 9 – 11: 2016 FIBA U18 3x3 European Championships in Debrecen
  - Men: France defeated Belgium, 19–15, in the final. Turkey took third place.
  - Women: France defeated Hungary, 11–10, in the final. The Czech Republic took third place.
- December 16 – 22: 2016 FIBA Europe Under-18 Championship in (Turkey) Samsun
  - Note: This event was temporarily postponed, due to the aftermath of the 2016 Turkish coup d'état attempt.
  - France defeated Lithuania, 75–68, to win their fourth FIBA Europe Under-18 Championship title.
  - Italy took third place.

=== FIBA Asia ===
- July 22 – 31: 2016 FIBA Asia Under-18 Championship in Tehran
  - Iran defeated Japan, 71–65, to win their third FIBA Asia Under-18 Championship title.
  - South Korea took third place.
- September 9 – 18: 2016 FIBA Asia Challenge in Tehran
  - Iran defeated South Korea, 77–47, to win their third consecutive FIBA Asia Challenge title.
  - Jordan took third place.
- October 8 – 16: 2016 FIBA Asia Champions Cup in Chenzhou
  - China Kashgar defeated (Lebanon) Al-Riyadi, 96–88, to win their first FIBA Asia Champions Cup title.
  - (Iran) Petrochimi took third place.
- November 13 – 20: 2016 FIBA Asia Under-18 Championship for Women in (Thailand) Bangkok
  - China defeated Japan, 78–47, to win their fourth consecutive and 15th overall FIBA Asia Under-18 Championship for Women title.
  - South Korea took third place.

=== FIBA Africa ===
- July 22 – 31: 2016 FIBA Africa Under-18 Championship for Men in (Rwanda) Kigali
  - Angola defeated Egypt, 86–82, to win their fourth FIBA Africa Under-18 Championship title.
  - Mali took third place.
- August 26 – September 4: 2016 FIBA Africa Under-18 Championship for Women in Cairo
  - Mali defeated Egypt, 84–61, to win their second consecutive and sixth overall FIBA Africa Under-18 Championship for Women title.
  - Mozambique took third place.

=== FIBA Oceania ===
- December 5 – 10: 2016 FIBA Oceania Under-18 Championship for Men and Women in (Fiji) Suva
  - Men: New Zealand defeated Australia, 57–51, to win their first Men's FIBA Oceania Under-18 Championship title.
    - Guam took third place.
  - Women: Australia defeated New Zealand, 107–52, to win their seventh consecutive Women's FIBA Oceania Under-18 Championship title.
    - Samoa took third place.

== Boccia ==
- March 19 – 26: BISFed 2016 World Individual Championships in (China) Beijing
  - Individual BC1 winner: (Thailand) Pattaya Tadtong
  - Individual BC2 winner: (Thailand) Worawut Saengampa
  - Individual BC3 winner: (South Korea) Jeong Ho-won
  - Individual BC4 winner: (United Kingdom) Stephen McGuire
- April 26 – May 2: BISFed 2016 World Open #1 in (Canada) Montreal
  - Individual BC1 winner: (South Korea) Lee Dong-won
  - Individual BC2 winner: (South Korea) Lee Young-jin
  - Individual BC3 winner: (South Korea) Jeong Ho-won
  - Individual BC4 winner: (South Korea) Seo Hyeon-seok
  - Pairs BC3 winners: South Korea
  - Pairs BC4 winners: Slovakia
  - Team BC1–BC2 winners: South Korea
- May 17 – 24: BISFed 2016 World Open #2 in (United Arab Emirates) Dubai
  - Individual BC1 winner: (Hong Kong) LEUNG Mei Yee
  - Individual BC2 winner: (Portugal) Abilio Valente
  - Individual BC3 winner: (Hong Kong) HO Yuen Kei
  - Individual BC4 winner: (Slovakia) Samuel Andrejcik
  - Pairs BC3 winners: Russia
  - Pairs BC4 winners: China
  - Team BC1–BC2 winners: Portugal
- June 14 – 19: BISFed 2016 World Open #3 in (Portugal) Póvoa de Varzim
  - Individual BC1 winner: (United Kingdom) David Smith
  - Individual BC2 winner: (Brazil) Maciel de Sousa Santos
  - Individual BC3 winner: (Portugal) José Carlos Macedo
  - Individual BC4 winner: (Slovakia) Samuel Andrejcik
  - Pairs BC3 winners: Russia
  - Pairs BC4 winners: Brazil
  - Team BC1-BC2 winners: Japan

== Canadian football ==
- November 27 – 104th Grey Cup: Ottawa Redblacks defeat Calgary Stampeders, 39–33 (in overtime).

== Chess ==
- February 10 – December 18: 2016 FIDE (World Chess Federation) calendar

=== World events ===
- February 10 – 24, 2016: FIDE Women's Grand Prix #2 in (Iran) Tehran
  - Winner: (China) Ju Wenjun
- April 19 – May 3, 2016: FIDE Women's Grand Prix #3 in (Georgia (country)) Batumi
  - Winner: (Russia) Valentina Gunina
- July 1 – 15: FIDE Women's Grand Prix #4 in (China) Chengdu
  - Winner: (India) Harika Dronavalli
- November 18 – December 2: FIDE Women's Grand Prix #5 in (Russia) Khanty-Mansiysk
  - Winner: (China) Ju Wenjun
- February 25 – March 3: IMSA Elite Mind Games in (China) Huai'an
  - Winners of rapid chess: (Azerbaijan) Shakhriyar Mamedyarov (m) / (China) Tan Zhongyi
  - Winners of blitz chess: (Azerbaijan) Rauf Mamedov (m) / (Russia) Kateryna Lagno (f)
  - Winners of Basque chess: (China) Ding Liren (m) / (Russia) Alexandra Kosteniuk (f)
- March 1 – 19: Women's World Chess Championship 2016 in (Ukraine) Lviv
  - Winner: (China) Hou Yifan
- March 10 – 30: Candidates Tournament in (Russia) Moscow
  - Winner: (Russia) Sergey Karjakin
- April 8 – 15: 14th World University Chess Championship in (United Arab Emirates) Abu Dhabi
  - Winners: (Armenia) Hovhannes Gabuzyan (m) / (China) Ni Shiqun (f)
- April 18 – 28: World Amateur Chess Championship 2016 in (Greece) Chalkidiki
  - Under 2300 winner: (Kazakhstan) Zhuban Bigabylov
  - Under 2000 winner: (Mongolia) Enkhsaikhan Khulan
  - Under 1700 winner: (India) Jatin SN
- May 17 – 25: 2016 ICCD World Individual Deaf Chess Championships in (Armenia) Yerevan
  - Men's winner: (Italy) Duilio Collutiis
  - Junior men winner: (Russia) Mikhail Petrenko
  - Women's winner: (Ukraine) Tatiana Baklanova
- June 26 – July 4: World Senior Team Chess Championship 50+, 65+ 2016 in Dresden
  - 50+ winners: Germany (Uwe Bönsch, Klaus Bischoff, Karsten Volke, Raj Tischbierek, Gernot Gauglitz)
  - 65+ winners: Russia (Evgeny Sveshnikov, Evgeni Vasiukov, Yuri Balashov, Vladimir V. Zhelnin, Nikolai Pushkov)
  - Women's winners: Russia (Galina Strutinskaia, Svetlana Mednikova, Valentina Kozlovskaya, Elena Fatalibekova, Elena N. Sazonova)
- July 22 – 29: World Youth U-16 Chess Olympiad 2016 in (Slovakia) Poprad
  - Winners: Iran
- July 30 – August 7: Commonwealth Chess Championship 2016 in (Sri Lanka) Wadduwa
  - Winners: (India) Abhijeet Gupta (m) / (India) Tania Sachdev (f)
  - U8 winner: (India) P. Das Swayham (m) / A. N. Shefali (f)
  - U10 winners: (India) D. Gukesh (m) / (India) Sanskruti Wankhede (f)
  - U12 winners: (Sri Lanka) Malan Pathirana (m) / (India) Narayani Adane(f)
  - U14 winners: (India) P. Iniyan (m) / (India) Meenal Gupta (f)
  - U16 winners: (Sri Lanka) Minul Sanjula Doluweera (m) / (India) Hagawane Aakanksha
  - U18 winners: (India) Sarkar Rajdeep (m) / (India) Mohanty Smaraki
  - U20 winners: (South Africa) Roland Bezuidenhout (m) / (India) P. V. Nandhidhaa
  - Senior winner: (Australia) Richard Voon
- August 7 – 21: World Junior Chess Championships 2016 in (India) Bhubaneswar
  - Winners: (United States) Jeffery Xiong (m) / (Kazakhstan) Dinara Saduakassova (f)
- September 1 – 14: 42nd Chess Olympiad in (Azerbaijan) Baku
  - Open winners: United States (Fabiano Caruana, Hikaru Nakamura, Wesley So, Sam Shankland, Ray Robson)
  - Women's winners: China (Hou Yifan, Ju Wenjun, Zhao Xue, Tan Zhongyi, Guo Qi)
- September 20 – October 4: World Youth U14, U16, U18 Championships 2016 in (Russia) Khanty-Mansiysk
  - U14 winners: (Russia) Semen Lomasov (m) / (China) Zhu Jiner (f)
  - U16 winners: (Armenia) Haik M. Martirosyan (m) / (India) Aakanksha Hagawane (f)
  - U18 winners: (Armenia) Manuel Petrosyan (m) / (Greece) Stavroula Tsolakidou (f)
- October 18 – 31: World Cadets U8, U10, U12 Championships 2016 in (Georgia (country)) Batumi
  - U8 winners: (Turkmenistan) Shageldi Kurbandurdyew (m) / (Kazakhstan) Aisha Zakirova (f)
  - U10 winners: (Russia) Ilya Makoveev (m) / (United States) Rochelle Wu (f)
  - U12 winners: (United States) Nikhil Kumar (m) / (Russia) Bibisara Assaubayeva (f)
- November 11–30: World Chess Championship 2016: Carlsen – Karjakin in (United States) New York City
  - (Norway) Magnus Carlsen defeated (Russia) Sergey Karjakin, 9–7.
- November 18 – December 1: World Senior Chess Championships 2016 in (Czech Republic) Mariánské Lázně
  - 50+ winners: (Georgia (country)) Giorgi Bagaturov (m) / (Russia) Tatiana Bogumil (f)
  - 65+ winners: (France) Anatoly Vaisser (m) / (Georgia (country)) Nona Gaprindashvili (f)

=== European events ===
- April 1 – 11: 2nd European Small Nations Individual Chess Championship in Luxembourg City
  - Winner: (Faroe Islands) Helgi Dam Ziska
- April 18 – 27: European Senior Team Chess Championship 2016 in Greece
  - Seniors 50+ winners: Israel (Alon Greenfeld, Yehuda Gruenfeld, Alexander Huzman, Ram Soffer)
  - Seniors 65+ winners: Russia (Yuri Balashov, Nikolai M Mishuchkov, Nikolai Pushkov, Evgeni Vasiukov, Vladimir V Zhelnin)
- May 11 – 24: European Individual Chess Championship 2016 in (Kosovo) Gjakova
  - Winner: (Russia) Ernesto Inarkiev
- May 26 – June 8: European Individual Women's Chess Championship 2016 in (Romania) Mamaia
  - Winner: (Ukraine) Anna Ushenina
- June 4 – 14: European Senior Individual Championship 2016 in Armenia
  - 50+ winners: (Georgia (country)) Zurab Sturua (m) / (Russia) Galina Strutinskaia (f)
  - 65+ winners: (Ukraine) Valentin Bogdanov (m) / (Georgia (country)) Nona Gaprindashvili (f)
- June 6 – 12: European Amateur Chess Championship 2016 in (Slovakia) Ruzomberok
  - Winner: (Ukraine) Anatoly Borodavkin
- June 16 – 26: European School Chess Championship 2016 in (Greece) Chalkidiki
  - U7 winners: (Azerbaijan) Ziya Mammadov (m) / (Russia) Sofya Svergina (f)
  - U9 winners: (Turkey) Taha Ozkan (m) / (Russia) Alexandra Shvedova (f)
  - U11 winners: (Turkey) Isik Can (m) / (Russia) Margarita Zvereva (f)
  - U13 winners: (Moldova) Ilie Martinovici (m) / (Russia) Alexandra Afanasieva (f)
  - U15 winners: (Finland) Toivo Keinanen (m) / (Russia) Alexandra Obolentseva (f)
  - U17 winner: (Russia) Timur Trubchaninov (m) / (Greece) Anastasia Avramidou (f)
- July 9 – 17: European Youth Team Chess Championship 2016 in (Slovenia) Celje
  - Men's winners: Israel
  - Women's winners: Ukraine
- July 13 – 24: European Universities Games 2016 in (Croatia) Zagreb
  - Winners: (Armenia) Hovhannes Gabuzyan (m) / (Serbia) Adela Velikić
  - Blitz winners: (Armenia) Zaven Andriasian (m) / (Russia) Anastasia Travkina
- July 24 – August 1: 1st IBCA European Team Chess Championship in Warsaw
  - Winners: Poland 1
- August 3 – 11: 2016 EU Youth Championships in (Austria) Mureck
  - EU U8 winner: (Bulgaria) Simeon Todev
  - EU U10 winner: (Slovenia) Vesna Mihelič
  - EU U12 winner: (Bulgaria) Momchil Petkov
  - EU U14 winner: (Germany) Maximilian Paul Maetzkow
- August 17 – 28: European Youth Chess Championship 2016 in (Czech Republic) Prague
  - U8 winners: (Russia) Artem Pingin (m) / (Russia) Alexandra Shvedova (f)
  - U10 winners: (Russia) Volodar Murzin (m) / (Hungary) Zsóka Gaál (f)
  - U12 winners: (Armenia) Mamikon Gharibyan (m) / (Turkey) Sila Çağlar (f)
  - U14 winners: (Spain) Salvador Guerra Rivera (m) / (Russia) Aleksandra Maltsevskaya (f)
  - U16 winners: (Russia) Timur Fakhrutdinov (m) / (Germany) Fiona Sieber (f)
  - U18 winners: (Armenia) Manuel Petrosyan (m) / (Georgia (country)) Nino Khomeriki (f)
- November 5 – 13: European Chess Club Cup 2016 for men and for women (Serbia) Novi Sad
  - Winners: (North Macedonia) Alkaloid (m) / (Monaco) Cercle d’Echecs Monte Carlo
- December 14 – 18: European Rapid and Blitz Chess Championships 2016 in (Estonia) Tallinn
- December 26 – 30: European Youth Rapid and Blitz Chess Championships 2016 in (Serbia) Novi Sad

=== American events ===
- February 19 – 28: American Continental Women's Championship in (Peru) Lima
  - Winner: (Peru) Deysi Cori
- March 24 – 29: CARIFTA Chess Championships U20 in (United States Virgin Islands) Saint Croix
  - U20 winners: (Barbados) Orlando Husbands (m) / (Aruba) Annelaine Jacobs (f)
  - U18 winners: (Barbados) Yu Tien Poon (m) / (United States Virgin Islands) Hazel Acosta (f)
  - U16 winners: (Trinidad and Tobago) Alan-Safar Ramoutar (m) / (Suriname) Catherine Kaslan (f)
  - U14 winners: (Trinidad and Tobago) Alan-Safar Ramoutar (m) / (Suriname) Catherine Kaslan (f)
  - U12 winners: (The Bahamas) Nathan Smith (m) / (Barbados) Azaria Johnson (f)
  - U10 winners: (Jamaica) Kishan Clarke (m) / (Aruba) Thamara Sagastegui (f)
  - U8 winner: (United States Virgin Islands) Jayden Barry
- April 27 – May 3: American Subzonal 2.3.5 Open & Women in (Barbados) Bridgetown
  - Winners: (Puerto Rico) Mark Machin Rivera (m) / (Jamaica) Deborah Richards (f)
- May 28 – June 5: 11th American Continental Chess Championship in (El Salvador) San Salvador
  - Winner: (Peru) Emilio Córdova Daza
- June 19 – 26: Panamerican U20 Chess Championship 2016 in (Colombia) Bogotà
  - Winners: (Brazil) Luis Paulo Supi (m) / (Mexico) Lilia Ivonne Fuentes Godoy (f)
- July 1 – 6: Panamerican University Championship 2016 in (Honduras) Tegucigalpa
  - Winners: (Costa Rica) Mattey Emanuel Vaglio (m) / (Costa Rica) Maria Elena Rodriguez Arrieta (f)
- July 11 – 18: Central American & Caribbean Junior U20 Chess Championships 2016 in (El Salvador) San Salvador
  - Winners: (Costa Rica) Bryan Solano Cuya (m) / (Cuba) Karla July Fernandez Rivero (f)
- July 24 – 31: Panamerican Youth Festival 2016 in (Uruguay) Montevideo
  - U8 winners: (United States) Marvin Gao (m) / (United States) Sophie Velea (f)
  - U10 winners: (Peru) Diego Saul Rod Flores Quillas (m) / (United States) Rianne Ke (f)
  - U12 winners: (United States) Arthur Guo (m) / (United States) Nastassja A Matus (f)
  - U14 winners: (Peru) German Gonzalo Quirhuayo Chumbe (m) / (Peru) Melanie Dongo (f)
  - U16 winners: (Argentina) Julian Villca (m) / (Colombia) Angie Gabriela Velasquez (f)
  - U18 winners: (Argentina) Franco Villegas (m) / (Bolivia) Nataly A Monroy G (f)
- August 7 – 11: North American Youth Chess Championship 2016 in Canada
  - U8 winners: (Canada) Kevin Zhong (m) / (United States) Sophie Velea (f)
  - U10 winners: (United States) Rohun Trakru (m) / (United States) Atmika Gorti (f)
  - U12 winners: (Canada) Nicholas Vettese (m) / (United States) Claire Cao (f)
  - U14 winners: (United States) Aaron Shlionsky (m) / (United States) Sasha Konovalenko (f)
  - U16 winners: (United States) Zhaozhi Li (m) / (Canada) Svitlana Demchenko (f)
  - U18 winner: (Canada) Michael Song (m) / (Canada) Maili-Jade Ouellet (f)
- August 15 – 22: Central American & Caribbean Youth Chess Championships 2016 in Caracas
  - Venezuela won both the gold and overall medal tallies.
- October 2 – 9: Panamerican Schools Chess Championship 2016 in (Peru) Lima
  - U7 winners: (Peru) Matias Vincent Lima Cardenas (m) / (Peru) Maria Fernanda Herrada Blanco (f)
  - U9 winners: (Peru) Nicola Forno Trujillo (m) / (Peru) Fiorella Contreras (f)
  - U11 winners: (Peru) Diego Saul Rod Flores Quillas (m) / (Chile) Julia Dennis Figueroa Bernal (f)
  - U13 winners: (Peru) Ivan Excen Soriano Quispe (m) / (Peru) Nicole Celestino (f)
  - U15 winners: (Ecuador) Junior Zambrano (m) / (Peru) Mitzy Mishell Caballero Quijano (f)
  - U17 winners: (Peru) Kevin Joel Cori Quispe (m) / (Peru) Blanca Solis Chimoy (f)
- October 25 – 30: Panamerican Amateur Chess Championship in (Argentina) Buenos Aires
  - Sub 1700 winner: (Argentina) Juan Dalmas Muzi
  - Sub 2000 winner: (Argentina) Nelson Lujan
  - Sub 2300 winner: (Peru) Renzo Gutiérrez
  - Blitz winner: (Argentina) Cristian Sanhueza
- October 31 – November 6: American Subzonal 2.3.3 in Panama City
  - Winners: (Costa Rica) Bernal González (m) / (Costa Rica) Maria Elena Rodriguez Arrieta (f)
- November 6 – 13: American Continental Women's Championship in (Mexico) Colima City
  - Winner: (Peru) Deysi Cori
- December 1 – 6: South American Youth Festival 2016 in (Chile) Santiago
  - U8 winners: (Colombia) Santiago Lopez Rayo (m) / (Brazil) Mirella Pedro Tereza (f)
  - U10 winners: (Bolivia) Axl Severich (m) / (Argentina) Juana Rueda Nessi (f)
  - U12 winners: (Colombia) Jose Gabriel Cardoso Cardoso (m) / (Peru) Arianna Sofia Arauco Celestino (f)
  - U14 winners: (Peru) Flavio Gonzales Curse (m) / (Peru) Stephanie Beatriz Puppi Lazo (f)
  - U16 winners: (Argentina) Lucas Coro (m) / (Peru) Mitzy Mishell Caballero Quijano (f)
  - U18 winners: (Argentina) Franco Villegas (m) / (Ecuador) Anahi Ortiz Verdesoto (f)

=== Asian events ===
- March 27 – April 8: Asian Nations Cup (Men and Women) 2016 in (United Arab Emirates) Abu Dhabi
  - Men's winners: India (Baskaran Adhiban, S. P. Sethuraman, Vidit Santosh Gujrathi, Krishnan Sasikiran, Deep Sengupta)
  - Women's winners: China (Ju Wenjun, Tan Zhongyi, Lei Tingjie, Guo Qi, Zhao Xue)
- April 6: Asian Nations Cup Rapid Championship 2016 in (United Arab Emirates) Abu Dhabi
  - Men's winner: China (Wang Yue, Bu Xiangzhi, Zhou Jianchao, Wei Yi, Lu Shanglei)
  - Women's winner: China (Ju Wenjun, Tan Zhongyi, Zhao Xue, Lei Tingjie, Guo Qi)
- April 7: Asian Nations Cup Blitz Championship 2016 in (United Arab Emirates) Abu Dhabi
  - Men's winner: China (Wang Yue, Bu Xiangzhi, Zhou Jianchao, Wei Yi, Lu Shanglei)
  - Women's winner: China (Ju Wenjun, Tan Zhongyi, Zhao Xue, Lei Tingjie, Guo Qi)
- April 5 – 15: Asian Youth U6, U8, 10, 12, 14, 16, 18 Championship 2016 in (Mongolia) Ulaanbaatar
  - U6 winners: (Uzbekistan) Khumoyun Begmuratov (m) / (Mongolia) Gantsolmon Enkh-Uyanga (f)
  - U8 winners: (Iran) Artin Ashraf (m) / (Vietnam) Tôn Nữ Quỳnh Dương (f)
  - U10 winners: (Mongolia) Ochirbat Lkhagvajamts (m) / (Mongolia) Davaakhuu Munkhzul (f)
  - U12 winners: (India) R. Praggnanandhaa (m) / (India) Divya Deshmukh (f)
  - U14 winners: (Uzbekistan) Nodirbek Yakubboev (m) / (India) Mishra Anwesha (f)
  - U16 winners: (Iran) Arash Tahbaz (m) / (Iran) Mobina Alinasab (f)
  - U18 winners: (Iran) Mersad Khodashenas (m) / (Vietnam) Nguyễn Thanh Thủy Tiên (f)
- April 9: Asian Youth Blitz Championship 2016 in (Mongolia) Ulaanbaatar
  - U6 winners: (Mongolia) Chin-Erdem Batbaatar (m) / (Mongolia) Pagamdulam Munkhdemberel (f)
  - U8 winners: (Vietnam) Dang Anh Minh (m) / (Vietnam) Vu My Linh (f)
  - U10 winners: (Mongolia) Yesuntumur Tugstumur (m) / (Vietnam) Nguyễn Hồng Nhung (f)
  - U12 winners: (India) R. Praggnanandhaa (m) / (India) Divya Deshmukh (f)
  - U14 winners: (Uzbekistan) Nodirbek Yakubboev (m) / (Mongolia) Turmunkh Munkhzul (f)
  - U16 winners: (Uzbekistan) Ortik Nigmatov (m) / (India) R. Vaishali (f)
  - U18 winners: (Kazakhstan) Arystanbek Urazayev (m) / (India) V. Varshini (f)
- April 10: Asian Youth Rapid Championship 2016 in (Mongolia) Ulaanbaatar
  - U6 winners: (Mongolia) Amarbat Baatar (m) / (Mongolia) Gantsolmon Enkh-Uyanga (f)
  - U8 winner: (Iran) Artin Ashraf (m) / (Vietnam) Vu My Linh (f)
  - U10 winners: (Mongolia) Yesuntumur Tugstumur (m) / (Mongolia) Davaakhuu Munkhzul (f)
  - U12 winners: (Vietnam) Duc Tri Ngo (m) / (Kazakhstan) Nazerke Nurgali (f)
  - U14 winners: (Mongolia) Yondonjamts Erdemdalai (m) / (Mongolia) Turmunkh Munkhzul (f)
  - U16 winners: (Mongolia) Byambasuren Garidmagnai (m) / (India) R. Vaishali (f)
  - U18 winners: (Mongolia) Erdenepurev Boldoo (m) / (Mongolia) Uurtsaikh Uuriintuya (f)
- May 2 – 11: Asian Juniors and Girls U-20 Championships 2016 in (India) New Delhi
  - Winners: (India) Aravindh Chithambaram (m) / (Mongolia) Uurtsaikh Uuriintuya (f)
- May 3: Asian Juniors and Girls Rapid Championship 2016 in (India) New Delhi
  - Winners: (Iran) Masoud Mosadeghpour (m) / (India) R. Vaishali (f)
- May 11: Asian Juniors and Girls Blitz Championship 2016 in (India) New Delhi
  - Winners: (India) Narayanan Sunilduth Lyna / (India) R. Vaishali (f)
- May 25 – June 5: Asian Individual Championship (Men and Women) 2016 in (Uzbekistan) Tashkent
  - Winners: (India) S. P. Sethuraman (m) / (India) Bhakti Kulkarni
- June 4: Asian Individual Blitz Championship (Men and Women) 2016 in (Uzbekistan) Tashkent
  - Winners: (China) Lu Shanglei (m) / (Vietnam) Nguyễn Thị Mai Hưng
- May 29 – June 8: 17th ASEAN+ Age Group Open Chess Championships 2016 in (Thailand) Pattaya
  - Vietnam won both the gold and overall medal tallies
- July 9 – 18: Asian Schools Chess Championships 2016 in (Iran) Tehran
  - U7 winners: (Uzbekistan) Alikhon Avazkhonov (m) / (Uzbekistan) Afruza Khamdamova (f)
  - U9 winners: (Iran) Yousefi Kafshgarkola Seyed Roh (m) / (Philippines) Daren Dela Cruz (f)
  - U11 winners: (Iran) Seyed Kian Poormosavi (m) / (Iran) Parnian Ghomi (f)
  - U13 winners: (Turkmenistan) Azat Nurmamedov (m) / (Iran) Motahare Asadi (f)
  - U15 winners: (Philippines) Stephen Rome Pangilinan (m) / (Iran) Sedigheh Kalantari (f)
  - U17 winners: (Iran) Arash Tahbaz (m) / (Philippines) Doroy Allaney Jia G (f)
- July 10: Asian Schools Rapid Championships 2016 in (Iran) Tehran
  - U7 winners: (Uzbekistan) Khumoyun Sindarov (m) / (Uzbekistan) Afruza Khamdamova (f)
  - U9 winners: (India) Roshan S (m) / (Mongolia) Erdenebat Enkhjin (f)
  - U11 winners: (Iran) Bardiya Daneshvar (m) / (Iran) Zahra Heydari (f)
  - U13 winners: (Iran) Mahan Saberi (m) / (Iran) Nikta Nadernia (f)
  - U15 winners: (Turkmenistan) Soltan Myradow (m) / (Philippines) Kylen Joy Mordido (f)
  - U17 winners: (Iran) Mohammadamin Molaei (m) / (Iran) Mitra Asgharzadeh (f)
- July 17: Asian Schools Blitz Championships 2016 in (Iran) Tehran
  - U7 winners: (China) Sunle Gong (m) / (Uzbekistan) Afruza Khamdamova (f)
  - U9 winners: (Singapore) Jagadeesh Siddharth (m) / (Sri Lanka) Ehsha Mishela Pallie (f)
  - U11 winners: (Iran) Bardiya Daneshvar (m) / (Turkmenistan) Lala Shohradowa (f)
  - U13 winners: (Philippines) Daniel Quizon (m) / (Iran) Saba Jalali (f)
  - U15 winners: (Uzbekistan) Daler Vakhidov (m) / (Iran) Sedigheh Kalantari (f)
  - U17 winners: (Iran) Mohammadamin Molaei (m) / (Philippines) Doroy Allaney Jia G (f)
- August 5 – 10: East Asian Youth Chess Championship in (South Korea) Gangwon Province
  - U8 mixed winner: (Mongolia) Enkh-Amgalan Amgalantengis
  - U10 winners: (New Zealand) Richard Meng (m) / (Mongolia) Munkhtur Tergel (f)
  - U12 mixed winner: (Mongolia) Ganzorig Amartuvshin
  - U14 mixed winner: (Mongolia) Ochirkhuyag Ulziikhishigjargal
  - U16 mixed winner: (Vietnam) Nguyễn Đặng Hồng Phúc
  - U20 mixed winner: (Indonesia) Muhammad Lutfi Ali
- September 1 – 6: South Asian Amateur Championship 2016 in (India) Srinagar
  - Winner: (India) V Raghav Srivathsav
- October 26 – November 5: Asian Seniors Chess Championship 2016 in (Myanmar) Mandalay
  - 50+ years winner: (Myanmar) Han Myint
  - 65+ years winner: (India) Wazeer Ahmad Khan
- November 16 – 25: Asian Amateur Chess Championship 2016 in Kuwait City

=== African events ===
- March 28 – April 6: African Zonal 4.4 in (Ghana) Accra (men only)
  - Winner: (Nigeria) Oladapo Adu
- April 22 – May 1: African Zonal 4.2 in (Tanzania) Dar-es-Salaam
  - Winners: (Egypt) Adham Kandil (m) / (Egypt) Shrook Wafa (f)
- April 23 – May 2: African Zonal 4.3 in (Mauritius) Le Morne
  - Winners: (South Africa) Ryan Pierre Van Rensburg (m) / (South Africa) Jesse Nikki February (f)
- May 23 – 31: African Zonal 4.1 in (Morocco) Taroudant
  - Winners: (Algeria) Adlane Arab / (Morocco) Rania Sbai (f)
- July 16 – 27: African Individual Championships in (Uganda) Kampala
  - Winners: (Egypt) Abdelrahman Hesham (m) / (Egypt) Shrook Wafa (f)
- July 25: African Blitz Championships in (Uganda) Kampala
  - Winners: (Egypt) Ahmed Adly (m) / (Egypt) Shrook Wafa (f)
- July 26: African Rapid Championships (Uganda) Kampala
  - Winners: (Egypt) Samy Shoker (m) / (Egypt) Shahenda Wafa (f)
- August 11 – 18: African Amateur Individual Championships in (Togo) Lomé
  - Under 2000 Open winner: (Ghana) Philip Elikem Ameku
  - Under 2300 Open winner: (Morocco) Anass Ouazri
- August 21 – 29: African Youth Championships in (South Africa) Port Elizabeth
  - U8 winners: (Egypt) Ahmed Kandil (m) / (South Africa) Yanti Nunnan (f)
  - U10 winners: (Algeria) Safin Benyahia (m) / (South Africa) Aarti Datharam (f)
  - U12 winners: (Algeria) Wassel Bousmaha (m) / (South Africa) Nicola Putter (f)
  - U14 winners: (Algeria) Samy Leffad (m) / (Algeria) Lina Nassr (f)
  - U16 winners: (South Africa) Keegan Agulhas (m) / (Algeria) Rania Nassr (f)
  - U18 winners: (Algeria) Ahmad Nassr (m) / (South Africa) Inge Marx (f)
- December 10 – 18: African Schools Individual Championships in (Zambia) Lusaka
- December 27 – January 6, 2017: African Junior Championships in (Tunisia) Tunis

=== Arab events ===
- February 1 – 9: 8th Arab Women Clubs Championship 2016 in Kuwait City
  - Overall winner club: (United Arab Emirates) Golden Team club
- October 1 – 10: Arab Individual Chess Championship 2016 (Women & Open) in Sudan
  - Winners: (Algeria) Mahfoud Oussedik (m) / (Algeria) Sabrina Latreche (f)
- October 4: Arab Individual Blitz Championship 2016 (Women & Open) in Sudan
  - Winners: (Qatar) Husein Aziz Nezad (m) / (Algeria) Sabrina Latreche (f)
- October 5 – 6: Arab Individual Rapid Championship 2016 (Women & Open) in Sudan
  - Winners: (Qatar) Husein Aziz Nezad (m) / (Jordan) Alshaeby Boshra (f)

== Cricket ==
- January 22 – February 14: 2016 Under-19 Cricket World Cup in Dhaka
  - The West Indies defeated India by 5 wickets in the final, to win their first Under-19 Cricket World Cup title. Bangladesh took third place.
- March 8 – April 3: 2016 ICC World Twenty20 in India
  - Men: The West Indies defeated England by 4 wickets to win their second ICC World Twenty20 title.
  - Women: The West Indies defeated Australia by 8 wickets to win their first ICC Women's World Twenty20 title.
- June 29 – August 7: 2016 Caribbean Premier League
  - The Jamaica Tallawahs defeated the Guyana Amazon Warriors, by nine wickets, to win their second Caribbean Premier League title.

== Draughts ==
World Draughts Federation International

=== International ===
- February 14 – 18: 2016 Qatar World Championship Turkish Draughts in Doha
  - Winner: (Turkey) Faik Yıldız
- February 25 – March 3: IMSA Elite Mind Games in (China) Huai'an
  - Rapid winners: (Russia) Alexander Georgiev (m) / (Russia) Matrena Nogovitsyna (f)
  - Blitz winners: (Russia) Alexei Chizhov (m) / (Russia) Darya Tkachenko (f)
  - Super blitz winners: (Russia) Alexander Schwarzman (m) / (Russia) Tamara Tansykkuzhina (f)
- April 29 – May 1: World Championship blitz & rapid in (Turkey) İzmir
  - Rapid winners: (Ukraine) Yuri Anikeev (m) / (Russia) Matrena Nogovitsyna (f)
  - Blitz winners: (Russia) Murodoullo Amrillaev (m) / (Russia) Aygul Idrisova
- May 2: 1st Women's World Championship Turkish Draughts in (Turkey) İzmir
  - Winner: (Russia) Darya Tkachenko
- June 9 – 12: Women's World Championship English Draughts (Checkers) in (Italy) Rome
  - Winner: (Turkmenistan) Amangul Berdieva
- July 8 – 15: World Title Match English Draughts (Checkers) Sergio Scarpetta-Michele Borghetti in (Italy) Rome
  - Winner: (Italy) Michele Borghetti
- July 20 – 30: Asian Championship 2016 in (Mongolia) Ulaanbaatar
  - 64 Standard Open winners: (China) Liu Jinxin (m) / (China) Liu Pei (f)
  - Blitz Open winners: (Uzbekistan) Alisher Artikov (m) / (China) Liu Pei (f)
  - 100 Standard Open winners: (Mongolia) Manlai Ravjir (m) / (Mongolia) Nyamjargal Munkhbaatar (f)
  - 100 Rapid Open winners: (China) ZHOU Wei (m) / (China) You Zhang (f)
  - 100 Blitz Open winners: (Mongolia) Ganjargal Ganbaatar (m) / (China) Sai Ya (f)
  - Turkish Open winners: (China) Chengcheng Tian (m) / (Mongolia) Batdelger Nandintsetseg (f)
- July 31 – August 9: European Youth Championship 2016 in (Belarus) Pinsk

Main

  - U10 winners: (Russia) Marsel Sharafutdinov (m) / (Russia) Rufina Tavlykaeva
  - U13 winners: (Russia) Nikita Volkov (m) / (Russia) Olga Balukova
  - U16 winners: (Russia) Marsel Sharafutdinov (m) / (Russia) Ksenia Nakhova
  - U19 winners: (Netherlands) Martijn van IJzendoorn (m) / (Russia) Ayanika Kychkina
  - U26 winners: (Belarus) Andrei Tolchykau (m) / (Belarus) Darja Fedorovich

Blitz

  - U10 winners: (Russia) Savva Zaika (m) / (Belarus) Nastassia Sakalova
  - U13 winners: (Russia) Nikita Volkov (m) / (Russia) Aygiza Muhametyanova
  - U16 winners: (Belarus) Michael Semyaniuk (m) / (Latvia) Elena Cesnokova
  - U19 winners: (Netherlands) Martijn van IJzendoorn (m) / (Poland) Katarzyna Stańczuk
  - U26 winners: (Belarus) Andrei Tolchykau (m) / (Russia) Aygul Idrisova
  - 'Rapid here not played
- September 1 – 19: Women's World Title Match Sadowska – Kamychleeva in (Poland) Karpacz
  - Winner: (Poland) Natalia Sadowska
- September 14 – 29: 2016 African Championship in (Mali) Bamako
  - Main winner: (Senegal) N'Diaga Samb
  - Blitz winner: (Cameroon) Jean Marc Ndjofang
- September 18 – 27: 2016 European Veteran Championship in (Germany) Korbach
  - Men's winner: (Russia) Evgeni Gurkov
  - Women's winner: (Lithuania) Romualda Shidlauskiene
- September 20 – 30: Pan American Championship in (Brazil) Águas de Lindóia
  - Winner: (Brazil) Allan Igor Moreno Silva
- September 22 – 29: XIII World Championship (Brazilian 64) in (Brazil) Águas de Lindóia
  - Winner: (Russia) Alexander Georgiev
- October 2 – 6: 2016 European Team Championship in (Estonia) Tallinn
  - Men's winners: Netherlands (Jan Groenendijk, Roel Boomstra, Alexander Baliakin)
  - Women's winners: Russia
- October 18 – 24: 2016 European Championship in (Turkey) İzmir
  - Winners: (Russia) Alexei Chizhov (m) / (Russia) Aygul Idrisova (f)
- October 25: 2016 European Rapid Championship in (Turkey) İzmir
  - Winners: (Russia) Alexander Schwarzman (m) / (Russia) Tamara Tansykkuzhina (f)
- October 26: 2016 European Blitz Championship in (Turkey) İzmir
  - Winners: (Russia) Ainur Shaibakov (m) / (Russia) Matrena Nogovitsyna (f)
- October 27: 2016 European Super-Blitz Cup in (Turkey) İzmir
  - Winners: (Russia) Alexei Chizhov (m) / (Russia) Matrena Nogovitsyna (f)

=== Major ===
- February 22 – 28: 2016 Cannes Open World Cup in (France) Cannes
  - Winners: (Cameroon) Christian Niami (m) / (Lithuania) Romualda Šidlauskienė
- March 19 – 27: Roethof Open World Cup in (Suriname) Paramaribo
  - Winners: (Russia) Alexander Schwarzman (m) / (Poland) Natalia Sadowska (f)
- May 15 – 23: Salou Open World Cup in (Spain) Salou
  - Winners: (Russia) Alexander Georgiev (m) / (Poland) Natalia Sadowska (f)
- September 4 – 10: Polish Open World Cup in (Poland) Karpacz
  - Winner: (Russia) Aleksandr Getmanski

=== Open ===
- February 5 – 7: 2016 Riga Open in (Latvia) Riga
  - Winner: (Lithuania) Edvardas Bužinskis
- March 24 – 28: 2016 Open Guadeloupe in Baie-Mahault
  - Winner: (France) Alexander Mogilianski
- May 6 – 15: 12th Thailand Open in Pattaya
  - Winner: (Russia) Ivan Trofimov
- July 24 – 30: 2016 Nijmegen Open in (Netherlands) Nijmegen
  - Winner: (Netherlands) Roel Boomstra
- August 5 – 13: 2016 Brunssum Open in (Netherlands) Brunssum
  - Winner: (Netherlands) Erno Prosman
- August 15 – 20: 2016 MTB Open in (Netherlands) Hoogeveen
  - Winner: (Netherlands) Martijn van IJzendoorn
- September 28 – October 5: 2016 Sunny Beach Open in (Bulgaria) Sunny Beach
- November 18 – 24: 4th "XingQiu Cup" International Open in (China) Lishui

== Field hockey ==
- January 15 – December 11: 2016 FIH Calendar of Events

=== 2016 Summer Olympics (FIH) ===
- August 6 – 19: 2016 Summer Olympics in (Brazil) Rio de Janeiro at the Olympic Hockey Centre
  - Men: (gold) Argentina; (silver) Belgium; (bronze) Germany
  - Women: (gold) Great Britain; (silver) Netherlands; (bronze) Germany

=== International field hockey events ===
- June 10 – 17: 2016 Men's Hockey Champions Trophy in (United Kingdom) London
  - Note: This event was slated for San Miguel de Tucumán, but the contract was cancelled.
  - Australia defeated India, 3–1 in penalties and after a 0–0 score in regular play, to win their 13th Men's Hockey Champions Trophy title.
  - Germany took third place.
- June 18 – 26: 2016 Women's Hockey Champions Trophy in (United Kingdom) London
  - Argentina defeated the Netherlands, 2–1, to win their third consecutive and seventh overall Women's Hockey Champions Trophy title.
  - The United States took third place.
- November 23 – December 4: 2016 Women's Hockey Junior World Cup in (Chile) Santiago
  - Argentina defeated the Netherlands, 4–2, to win their second Women's Hockey Junior World Cup title.
  - Australia took third place.
- December 8 – 18: 2016 Men's Hockey Junior World Cup in New Delhi
  - India defeated Belgium, 2–1, to win their second Men's Hockey Junior World Cup title.
  - Germany took third place.

=== European Hockey Federation (EHF) ===
- January 15 – 17: 2016 Men's EuroHockey Indoor Championship in (Czech Republic) Prague
  - Germany defeated Austria, 3–2, in the final. Russia took third place.
- January 22 – 24: 2016 Women's EuroHockey Indoor Championship in Minsk
  - The Netherlands defeated Poland, 6–2, in the final. Belarus took third place.
- February 12 – 14: 2016 Men's EuroHockey Indoor Club Champions Cup in (Germany) Hamburg
  - (Germany) Harvestehuder THC defeated (Austria) SV Arminen, 2–1, in the final. (Sweden) Partille Sport Club took third place.
- February 12 – 14: 2016 Men's EuroHockey Indoor Club Champions Trophy in (Russia) Pavlovski Posad
  - Winner: (Netherlands) AH&BC Amsterdam
  - Second: (Russia) Dinamo Elektrostal
  - Third: (Scotland) Inverleith HC
- February 19 – 21: 2016 Women's EuroHockey Indoor Club Champions Trophy in (Scotland) Dundee
  - Winner: (Germany) HC Rotweiss Wettingen
  - Second: (Belgium) Royal Pingouin HC
  - Third: (England) Bowdon Hightown
- February 19 – 21: 2016 Women's EuroHockdey Indoor Club Champions Cup in (Belarus) Minsk
  - (Germany) Düsseldorfer HC defeated (Spain) Club de Campo Villa de Madrid, 2–0, in the final. (Czech Republic) SK Slavia Prague took third place.
- May 13 – 16: 2016 EuroHockey Men's Club Champions Trophy in (Scotland) Glasgow
  - (Wales) Cardiff & Met defeated (Republic of Ireland) Banbridge Hockey Club, 4–0, in the final. (Scotland) Bromac Kelburne took third place.
- May 13 – 16: 2016 EuroHockey Women's Club Champions Cup in (Netherlands) Bilthoven
  - (Netherlands) HC 's-Hertogenbosch defeated fellow Dutch team, SCHC, 3–2 in penalty shoot-outs and after a 1–1 score in regular play, in the final. (Germany) UHC Hamburg took third place.
- May 13 – 16: 2016 EuroHockey Women's Club Champions Trophy in (Spain) Barcelona
  - (Germany) Rot-Weiss Köln defeated (Belgium) Royal Antwerp HC, 4–2, in the final. (Belarus) HC Minsk took third place.
- May 14 & 15: 2016 EHL Final Four in (Spain) Barcelona
  - (Netherlands) SV Kampong defeated fellow Dutch team, AH&BC Amsterdam, 2–0 in the final. (Germany) Harvestehuder THC took third place.
- July 24 – 30: 2016 EuroHockey Boys' and Girls' U18 Championships in (Republic of Ireland) Cork
  - Boys: Germany defeated the Netherlands, 4–3, in the final. Belgium took third place.
  - Girls: The Netherlands defeated Germany, 2–0, in the final. England took third place.

=== Pan American Hockey Federation (PAHF) ===
- March 29 – April 10: 2016 Pan American Junior Championship for Women in (Trinidad and Tobago) Tacarigua
  - Argentina defeated the United States, 6–0, to win their second consecutive and seventh overall Pan American Women's Field Hockey Junior Championship title.
  - Chile took the bronze medal.
- May 20 – 28: 2016 Pan American Junior Championship for Men in Toronto
  - Argentina defeated Canada, 5–0, to win their 11th consecutive Pan American Men's Field Hockey Junior Championship title.
  - Chile took the bronze medal.
- October 1 – 9: 2016 South American Championships for Men and Women in (Peru) Chiclayo
  - Men: 1. Chile; 2. Venezuela; 3. Uruguay
  - Women: 1. Uruguay; 2. Chile; 3. Brazil

=== Asian Hockey Federation (AHF) ===
- September 24 – 30: 2016 Boys' U18 Asia Cup in Dhaka
  - India defeated Bangladesh, 5–4, in the final.
- October 1 – 9: 2016 Women's AHF Cup in Bangkok
  - Thailand defeated Singapore, 4–0, in the final.
- October 20 – 30: 2016 Asian Men's Hockey Champions Trophy in Kuantan District
  - India defeated Pakistan, 3–2, to win their second Asian Men's Hockey Champions Trophy title. Malaysia took third place.
- October 29 – November 6: 2016 Asian Women's Hockey Champions Trophy in Singapore
  - India defeated China, 2–1, to win their first Asian Women's Hockey Champions Trophy title. Japan took third place.
- November 19 – 27: 2016 Men's AHF Cup in Hong Kong
  - Bangladesh defeated Sri Lanka, 3–0, in the final. Hong Kong took third place.
- December 15 – 22: 2016 Girl's U18 Asia Cup in (Thailand) Bangkok
  - China defeated Japan, 4–2, in the final. India took third place.

=== African Hockey Federation (AfHF) ===
- March 18 – 28: 2016 Junior African Cup for Men and Women in (Namibia) Windhoek
  - Men: Egypt defeated South Africa, 3–2, in the final. Zimbabwe took the bronze medal.
  - Women's winner: South Africa
  - Women's runner-up: Zimbabwe

== Fistball ==
- January 16 & 17: IFA 2016 Fistball Men's European Champions' Cup Indoor in (Switzerland) Diepoldsau
  - (Germany) TSV Dennach defeated (Austria) Union Arnreit 4–1, in the final. (Germany) Ahlhorner SV took third place.
- January 16 & 17: IFA 2016 Fistball Women's European Champions' Cup Indoor in (Switzerland) Rohrbach
  - (Germany) TSV Pfungstadt defeated (Austria) TuS Kremsmünster 4–0, in the final. (Germany) TV Schweinfurt-Oberndorf took third place.
- July 1 – 2: EFA 2016 Fistball Men's European Cup in (Austria) Unterweitersdorf
  - (Switzerland) STV Wigoltingen defeated (Germany) VFK Berlin, 3–2. (Germany) MTV Rosenheim took third place.
- July 1 – 2: Men's Champions Cup 2016 in (Germany) Pfungstadt
  - (Germany) TSV Pfungstadt defeated (Austria) Union Compact Freistadt 4–0, in the final. (Germany) TV SW-Oberndorf took third place.
- July 2 & 3: EFA 2016 Fistball Women's European Champions' Cup in (Switzerland) Jona
  - (Germany) TSV Dennach defeated (Switzerland) TSV Jona, 3–2. (Germany) SV Moslesfehn took third place.
- July 9 & 10: EFA 2016 Fistball U21 Men's European Championship in Switzerland
  - Round-robin: 1. Germany, 2. Switzerland, 3. Austria, 4. Czech Republic
- July 20 – 24: IFA 2016 Fistball U18 Men's and Women's World Championships in Nuremberg
  - Men's: Germany defeated Austria, 4–2.
  - Brazil took third place.
  - Women's: Germany defeated Brazil, 4–2
  - Switzerland took third place.
- August 5 – 7: IFA 2016 Fistball Women's World Cup in (Germany) Neuenbürg
  - (Brazil) Duque de Caixas defeated (Germany) TSV Dennach, 4–1.
- August 26 – 28: 2016 Fistball European Championships in Grieskirchen
  - In the final, Germany defeated Switzerland, 4–2. Austria took third place.
- October 14 – 16: IFA 2016 Fistball Men's World Cup in (South Africa) Cape Town
  - Winner: (Germany) TSV Pfungstadt, 2nd: (Brazil) Club Mercês, 3rd: (Australia) South Melbourne Fistball Club, 4th: (England) Archbishops of Banterbury
- October 23 – 30: IFA 2016 Fistball Women's World Championship in Pomerode
  - Germany defeated Brazil 4:2 (08:11, 11:04, 14:15, 11:09, 11:05, 11:06) to win their fifth Fistball Women's World Championship.
  - Switzerland took third place.
- November 4 – 6: U16 South American Fistball Championship in Novo Hamburgo
  - Men's: 1. Brazil, 2. Argentina, 3. Chile
  - Women's: 1. Brazil, 2. Argentina, 3. Chile
- November 19 & 20: IFA South America Fistball Cup 2016 in (Chile) Santiago
  - Men's: 1. (Brazil) Sogipa Porto Alegre, 2. (Brazil) Merces Curitiba, 3. (Brazil) Ginástica Novo Hamburgo
  - Women's: 1. (Brazil) Duque de Caxias Curitiba, 2. (Brazil) Sogipa Porto Alegre, 3. (Chile) Club Manquehue Santiago

== Floorball ==
=== Open ===
- August 11 – 14: Czech Open (clubs) in (Czech Republic) Prague
  - Men: (Finland) EräViikingit defeated (Sweden) Hollvikens, 2–0.
    - Top scorer: Mika Moilanen (EräViikingit)
    - Best goalie: Robin Johansson (Höllviken IBF)
    - Best player: Miko Kailiala (EräViikingit)
  - Women: (Sweden) Pixbo Wallenstam IBK defeated (Czech Republic) 1. SC TEMPISH Vítkovice 4–3.
    - Top scorer: Martina Řepková (Florbal Chodov)
    - Best goalkeeper: Lenka Kubíčková (1. SC TEMPISH Vítkovice)
    - Best player: Stephanie Boberg (Pixbo Wallenstam IBK)
- September 9 – 11: Polish Open (national teams) in (Poland) Wrocław
  - In the final, Finland defeated Czech Republic, 3–4. Norway took third place.
    - Best scorer: (Finland) Rasmus Kainulainen
    - Best Goalkeeper: (Czech Republic) Daniel Mück

=== Europe ===
- August 24 – 28: EuroFloorball Challenge in (Hungary) Budapest and Érd
  - Men's: (Hungary) Phoenix Fireball SE defeated (Hungary) Dunai Krokodilok SE, 7–4. (Italy) FBC Bozen.
  - Women's: (Spain) CDE El Valle defeated (Hungary) Neumann Pillangók, 4–1. (Hungary) Phoenix Fireball SE took third place.
- September 30 – October 2: Champions Cup in (Sweden) Borås
  - Men's: (Sweden) Storvreta IBK defeated (Finland) SC Classic, 2–1.
  - Women's: (Sweden) Pixbo Wallenstam IBK defeated (Finland) SC Classic, 6–2.
- October 5 – 9: EuroFloorball Cup in (Germany) Weißenfels
  - Men's: (Germany) UHC Weißenfels defeated (Latvia) FK Lielvārde 8–6.
  - Women's: (Norway) Sveiva IB defeated (Germany) UHC Weißenfels 5–0.

=== International Championships ===
- May 4 – 8: 2016 Women's under-19 World Floorball Championships in (Canada) Belleville
  - Sweden defeated Finland, 6–3, to win their fifth Women's under-19 World Floorball Championships. Switzerland took third place.
- July 19 – 24: World University Championships in (Portugal) Porto
  - Men: Finland defeated Sweden, 5–4, in extra time. Switzerland took third place.
  - Women: Finland defeated Sweden, 3–2 after penalties, after 2–2 in regular game. Czech Republic took third place.
- December 3 – 11: 2016 Men's World Floorball Championships in (Latvia) Riga
  - Finland defeated Sweden, 4–2 after penalties, after 3–3 in regular game. Switzerland took third place.

== Futsal ==
- February 2 – 13: UEFA Futsal Euro 2016 in Serbia
  - Spain defeated Russia, 7–3, to win their seventh UEFA Futsal Euro title. Kazakhstan took third place.
- February 10 – 21: 2016 AFC Futsal Championship in Uzbekistan
  - Iran defeated Uzbekistan, 2–1, to win their eleventh AFC Futsal Championship title. Thailand took third place.
- April 15 – 24: 2016 Africa Futsal Cup of Nations in South Africa
  - Morocco defeated Egypt, 3–2, to win their first Africa Futsal Cup of Nations title. Mozambique took third place.
- May 8 – 14: 2016 CONCACAF Futsal Championship in Costa Rica
  - Costa Rica defeated Panama, 4–0, to win their second consecutive and third overall CONCACAF Futsal Championship title. Guatemala took third place.
- May 21 – 28: 2016 South American Under-17 Futsal Championship in Foz do Iguaçu
  - Brazil defeated Argentina, 4–2, to win their first South American Under-17 Futsal Championship. Venezuela took third place.
- June 12 – 19: Copa Libertadores de Futsal 2016 in (Paraguay) Asunción
  - In the final, (Paraguay) Cerro Porteño defeated (Brazil) Jaraguá, 4–2, to win their first Copa Libertadores Cup. (Colombia) Rionegro Futsal took third place.
- July 2 – 10: 2016 FISU World University Futsal Championship in Goiânia
  - Men: Brazil defeated Russia, 2–1, in the final. The Czech Republic took third place.
  - Women: Brazil defeated Russia, 1–0, in the final. Portugal took third place.
- July 10 – 16: 2016 AFF Futsal Club Championship in Naypyidaw
  - Men: (Thailand) Port Futsal Club defeated (Vietnam) Thai Son Nam, 4–3, to win their second consecutive AFF Futsal Club Championship title.
  - Myanmar Imperial College took third place.
  - Women: (Indonesia) Jaya Kencana Angels defeated (Thailand) Khon Kaen Futsal Team, 5–4 on penalties and after a 2–2 score in regular play, to win their first Women's AFF Futsal Club Championship title.
  - (Vietnam) Thai Son Nam District 8 took third place.
- July 15 – 22: 2016 CONMEBOL Women's U20 Futsal Championships in Asunción (debut event)
  - Brazil defeated Colombia, 4–2, to win the inaugural CONMEBOL Women's U20 Futsal Championships title.
  - Paraguay took third place.
- July 15 – 23: 2016 AFC Futsal Club Championship in (Thailand) Bangkok
  - (Japan) Nagoya Oceans defeated (Iraq) Naft Al-Wasat SC, 6–5 in penalties and after a 4–4 score in regular play, to win their third AFC Futsal Club Championship title.
  - (Thailand) Chonburi Blue Wave took third place.
- September 10 – October 1: 2016 FIFA Futsal World Cup in Colombia
  - Argentina defeated Russia, 5–4, to win their first FIFA Futsal World Cup title.
  - Iran took third place.
- October 31 – November 8: 2016 AFF Futsal Championship in (Thailand) Bangkok
  - Event cancelled. The 2017 event, in Vietnam, would the next such event to be hosted.
- December 11 – 18: 2016 South American Under-20 Futsal Championship in Uruguay
  - Argentina defeated Brazil, 2–1, to win their first South American Under-20 Futsal Championship title.
  - Venezuela took third place.

== Golf ==
=== 2016 Summer Olympics ===
- August 11 – 14: 2016 Summer Olympics (Men) in Rio de Janeiro
  - (gold) (United Kingdom) Justin Rose; (silver) (Sweden) Henrik Stenson; (bronze) (United States) Matt Kuchar
- August 17 – 20: 2016 Summer Olympics (Women) in Rio de Janeiro
  - (gold) (South Korea) Inbee Park; (silver) (New Zealand) Lydia Ko; (bronze) (China) Shanshan Feng

=== 2016 Men's major golf championships ===
- April 7 – 10: 2016 Masters Tournament
  - Winner: (England) Danny Willett (first major win; first PGA Tour win)
- June 16 – 19: 2016 U.S. Open
  - Winner: (United States) Dustin Johnson (first major win; 10th PGA Tour win)
- July 14 – 17: 2016 Open Championship
  - Winner: (Sweden) Henrik Stenson (first major win)
- July 28 – 31: 2016 PGA Championship
  - Winner: (United States) Jimmy Walker (first major win; 6th PGA Tour win)

==== 2016 World Golf Championships (WGC) ====
- March 3–6: 2016 WGC-Cadillac Championship
  - Winner: (Australia) Adam Scott (second WGC win, first WGC-Cadillac win)
- March 23–27: 2016 WGC-Dell Match Play
  - Winner: (Australia) Jason Day (second WGC-Match Play win)
- June 30 – July 3: 2016 WGC-Bridgestone Invitational
  - Winner: (United States) Dustin Johnson (first WGC-Bridgestone Invitational win, third WGC win; 11th PGA Tour win)
- October 27–30: 2016 WGC-HSBC Champions
  - Winner: (Japan) Hideki Matsuyama (first WGC win, third PGA Tour win)

==== Other men's golf events ====
- May 12 – 15: 2016 Players Championship
  - Winner: (Australia) Jason Day (first Players win, tenth PGA Tour win)
- May 26 – 29: 2016 BMW PGA Championship (European Tour)
  - Winner: (England) Chris Wood (first BMW PGA Championship win, third European Tour win)
- September 30 – October 2: 2016 Ryder Cup at Hazeltine National Golf Club in Chaska, Minnesota
  - Winner: Team USA (First victory since 2008)
- November 24 – 27: 2016 World Cup of Golf at Kingston Heath Golf Club in Melbourne, Australia
  - Winner: Denmark (first World Cup victory)

=== 2016 Senior major golf championships ===
- May 19 – 22: Regions Tradition
  - Winner: (Germany) Bernhard Langer (first Regions Tradition title; sixth Senior major golf championship win)
- May 26 – 29: Senior PGA Championship
  - Winner: (United States) Rocco Mediate (first Senior PGA Championship and Senior Major win)
- June 9 – 12: Constellation Senior Players Championship
  - Winner: (Germany) Bernhard Langer (third straight Senior Players Championship title; seventh Senior major golf championship win)
- July 21 – 24: Senior Open Championship
  - Winner: (England) Paul Broadhurst (first Senior Open Championship and Senior Major win)
- August 11 – 15: U.S. Senior Open
  - Winner: (United States) Gene Sauers (first US Senior Open and Senior Major win)

=== 2016 Women's major golf championships ===
- March 31 – April 3: 2016 ANA Inspiration
  - Winner: (New Zealand) Lydia Ko (second consecutive major win, first ANA Inspiration win; second consecutive LPGA Tour win)
- June 9 – 12: 2016 KPMG Women's PGA Championship
  - Winner: (Canada) Brooke Henderson (first Major win, second LPGA Tour win)
- July 7 – 10: 2016 U.S. Women's Open
  - Winner: (United States) Brittany Lang (first Major win, second LPGA Tour win)
- July 28 – 31: 2016 Women's British Open
  - Winner: (Thailand) Ariya Jutanugarn (first Major win, fourth LPGA Tour win)
- September 15 – 18: 2016 Evian Championship
  - Winner: (South Korea) Chun In-gee (first Evian Championship win, second Major win, second LPGA Tour win)

=== 2016 International Crown ===
- July 21 – 24: 2016 International Crown at the Merit Club in Libertyville, Illinois (Chicago metropolitan area)
  - Winners: The United States (13 points)

=== FISU ===
- June 22 – 26: 2016 World University Golf Championship in Brive-la-Gaillarde
  - Men's Individual: 1 (Republic of Ireland) Robin Dawson, 2. (China) Xuewem Luo, 3. (Chinese Taipei) Yu-Chen Yeh
  - Women's Individual: 1. (Czech Republic) Karolina Vlckova, 2. (Czech Republic) Marie Luňáčková, 3. (Czech Republic) Kateřina Vlašínová
  - Men's Team: 1. France, 2. Ireland, 3. Chinese Taipei
  - Women's Team: 1. Czech Republic, 2. Chinese Taipei, 3. United States

== Grass skiing ==
- July 23 – 29: 2016 FIS Grass Ski Junior World Championships in (Iran) Dizin
  - Super Combined winners: (Czech Republic) Martin Barták (m) / (Austria) Kristin Hetfleisch (f)
  - Super G #1 winners: (Czech Republic) Martin Barták (m) / (Austria) Kristin Hetfleisch (f)
  - Super G #2 winners: (Czech Republic) Martin Barták (m) / (Japan) Marino Maeda (f)
  - Slalom winners: (Czech Republic) Martin Barták (m) / (Czech Republic) Magdaléna Kotyzová (f)
  - Giant Slalom winners: (Germany) Marcel Knapp (m) / (Austria) Daniela Krueckel (f)

=== 2016 FIS Grass Ski World Cup ===
- June 4 & 5: WC #1 in (Austria) Rettenbach
  - Men's Giant Slalom winner: (Italy) Edoardo Frau
  - Women's Giant Slalom winner: (Austria) Jacqueline Gerlach
  - Men's Super Combined winner: (Switzerland) Mirko Hüppi
  - Women's Super Combined winner: (Austria) Jacqueline Gerlach
- July 2 & 3: WC #2 in (Czech Republic) Předklášteří
  - Men's Slalom winner: (Czech Republic) Jan Gardavsky
  - Women's Slalom winner: (Austria) Jacqueline Gerlach
  - Men's Giant Slalom winner: (Austria) Michael Stocker
- July 8 – 10: WC #3 in (Austria) Kaprun
  - Men's Super G winner: (Switzerland) Mirko Hüppi
  - Women's Super G winner: (Slovakia) Barbara Míková
  - Men's Super Combined winner: (Italy) Edoardo Frau
  - Women's Super Combined winner: (Austria) Jacqueline Gerlach
  - Men's Giant Slalom winner: (Italy) Edoardo Frau
  - Women's Giant Slalon winner: (Austria) Kristin Hetfleisch
- August 20 & 21: WC #7 in (Italy) Santa Caterina Ski Area
  - Men's Slalom #1 winner: (Austria) Michael Stocker
  - Men's Slalom #2 winner: (Austria) Michael Stocker
  - Women's Slalom #1 winner: (Austria) Jacqueline Gerlach
  - Women's Slalom #2 winner: (Austria) Daniela Krückel
- August 27 & 28: WC #5 in (Switzerland) Marbach
  - Men's Giant Slalom winner: (Italy) Edoardo Frau
  - Women's Giant Slalom winner: (Austria) Jacqueline Gerlach
  - Men's Super G winner: (Italy) Edoardo Frau
  - Women's Super G winner: (Slovakia) Barbara Míková
- September 1 – 4: WC #6 (final) in (Italy) Ravascletto
  - Men's Giant Slalom winner: (Austria) Marc Zickbauer
  - Women's Giant Slalom winner: (Slovakia) Barbara Míková
  - Men's Super G winner: (Austria) Michael Stocker
  - Women's Super G winner: (Slovakia) Barbara Míková
  - Men's Super Combined winner: (Austria) Marc Zickbauer
  - Women's Super Combined winner: (Slovakia) Barbara Míková
  - Men's Slalom winner: (Czech Republic) Jan Gardavský
  - Women's Slalom winner: (Austria) Daniela Krueckel

== Handball ==
- January 6 – December 18: 2016 IHF Calendar of Events

=== 2016 Summer Olympics (IHF) ===
- August 6 – 21: 2016 Summer Olympics in (Brazil) Rio de Janeiro at the Olympic Training Center
  - Men: (gold) Denmark; (silver) France; (bronze) Germany
  - Women: (gold) Russia; (silver) France; (bronze) Norway

=== EHF ===
- September 5, 2015 – May 29, 2016: 2015–16 EHF Champions League
  - (Poland) Vive Targi Kielce defeated (Hungary) MVM Veszprém KC, 39–38, after overtime and penalties, to win their first EHF Champions League title.
  - (France) Paris Saint-Germain took third place.
- September 5, 2015 – May 15, 2016: 2015–16 EHF Cup
  - (Germany) Frisch Auf Göppingen defeated (France) HBC Nantes, 32–26, to win their first EHF Cup title. (Spain) BM Granollers took third place.
- October 11, 2015 – May 21, 2016: 2015–16 EHF Challenge Cup
  - (Portugal) ABC Braga defeated (Portugal) S.L. Benfica, 53–51, to win their first EHF Challenge Cup title.
- September 12, 2015 – May 7, 2016: 2015–16 Women's EHF Champions League
  - (Romania) CSM Bucharest defeated (Hungary) Győri ETO, 29–26, to win their first Women's EHF Champions League title. (North Macedonia) ŽRK Vardar took third place.
- October 16, 2015 – May 6, 2016: 2015–16 Women's EHF Cup
  - (Hungary) Dunaújvárosi Kohász KA defeated (Germany) TuS Metzingen, 55–49, to win their second Women's EHF Cup title.
- October 17, 2015 – May 7, 2016: 2015–16 Women's EHF Cup Winners' Cup
  - (Denmark) Team Tvis Holstebro defeated (Russia) Handball Club Lada, 61–52, to win their first Women's EHF Cup Winners' Cup title.
- November 14, 2015 – May 7, 2016: 2015–16 Women's EHF Challenge Cup
  - (Spain) Gran Canaria defeated (Turkey) Kastamonu Bld. GSK, 62–54, to win their first Women's EHF Challenge Cup title.
- January 15 – 31: 2016 European Men's Handball Championship in Poland
  - Germany defeated Spain, 24–17, to win their second European Men's Handball Championship title. Croatia took the bronze medal.
- July 4 – 8: 2016 European Open Handball Championship for Women in Gothenburg
  - Sweden defeated Denmark, 34–33, to win their first European Open Handball Championship title. Norway took third place.
- July 8 – 10: 2016 European Youth Beach Handball Championship in Nazaré
  - Men: Spain defeated Portugal, 2–1 in matches played, in the final. Italy took third place.
  - Women: The Netherlands defeated Spain, 2–0 in matches played, in the final. Portugal took third place.
- July 28 – August 7: 2016 European Men's Junior Handball Championship in (Denmark) Kolding
  - Spain defeated Germany, 30–29, to win their second European Men's Junior Handball Championship title.
  - France took third place.
- December 4 – 18: 2016 European Women's Handball Championship in Sweden
  - Norway defeated the Netherlands, 30–29, to win their second consecutive and seventh overall European Women's Handball Championship title.
  - France took third place.

=== CAHB ===
- January 21 – 30: 2016 African Men's Handball Championship in Egypt
  - Egypt defeated Tunisia, 21–19, to win their sixth African Men's Handball Championship title. Angola took the bronze medal.
- May 4 – 14: 2016 African Women's Handball Cup Winners' Cup in (Morocco) Laayoune
  - (Angola) Primeiro de Agosto defeated (Cameroon) TKC Yaoundé, 40–16, to win their second Women's African Handball Cup Winners' Cup. (Angola) Progresso took third place.
- May 4 – 14: 2016 African Handball Cup Winners' Cup in (Morocco) Laayoune
  - (Egypt) Zamalek SC defeated (Tunisia) Espérance Tunis, 26–25, to win their fifth African Handball Cup Winners' Cup. (Tunisia) AS Hammamet took third place.
- May 4: 2016 African Handball Super Cup for men's and women's in (Morocco) Laayoune
  - Men: (Tunisia) Espérance Tunis defeated (Egypt) Zamalek SC, 33–32, after overtime, to win their second African Handball Super Cup.
  - Women: (Angola) Primeiro de Agosto defeated (Ivory Coast) Africa Sports, 33–14, to win their second African Handball Super Cup.
- September 2 – 9: 2016 African Men's Youth Handball Championship in (Mali) Bamako
  - Tunisia defeated Egypt, 26–25, to win their first African Men's Youth Handball Championship title.
  - Algeria took the bronze medal.
- September 11 – 18: 2016 African Men's Junior Handball Championship in (Mali) Bamako
  - Tunisia defeated Egypt, 26–25, to win their fourth African Men's Junior Handball Championship title.
  - Algeria took the bronze medal.

=== AHF ===
- January 15 – 28: 2016 Asian Men's Handball Championship in Bahrain
  - Qatar defeated Bahrain, 27–22, to win their second consecutive Asian Men's Handball Championship title. Japan took the bronze medal.
- March 18 – 24: 18th Asian Club League 2016 in (Qatar) Doha
  - 1. (Qatar) Lekhwiya; 2. (Bahrain) Al-Najma; 3. (Saudi Arabia) Al-Noor
- July 22 – August 1: 2016 Asian Men's Junior Handball Championship in (Jordan) Amman
  - Qatar defeated Saudi Arabia, 23–16, to win their fifth title and fourth consecutive Asian Men's Junior Handball Championship.
  - South Korea took third place.
- August 10 – 17: 2016 Asian Men's & Women's Youth Beach Handball Championship in Pattaya (debut event)
  - Men: 1. Thailand; 2. Chinese Taipei; 3. Pakistan
  - Women: 1. China; 2. Thailand; 3. Chinese Taipei
- August 27 – September 5: 2016 Asian Men's Youth Handball Championship in Manama
  - Bahrain defeated Japan, 25–23, to win their first Asian Men's Youth Handball Championship title.
  - South Korea took third place.
- October 26 – November 1: 2016 Asian Women's Club League Handball Championship in (Kazakhstan) Kyzylorda (debut event)
  - 1. (Kazakhstan) Kaysar; 2. (Kazakhstan) Almaty Club; 3. (Kazakhstan) Ile Club
- October 29 – November 5: 2016 Asian Men's Club League Handball Championship in (Jordan) Amman
  - (Saudi Arabia) Al-Noor defeated (Qatar) El Jaish SC, 25–23, to win their first Asian Men's Club League Handball Championship title.
  - (Qatar) Lekhwiya Handball Team took third place.

=== PATHF ===
- March 15 – 19: 2016 Pan American Women's Junior Handball Championship in Foz do Iguaçu
  - 1. Brazil; 2. Argentina; 3. Chile
- April 12 – 16: 2016 Pan American Women's Youth Handball Championship in (Chile) Santiago
  - 1. Brazil; 2. Paraguay; 3. Argentina
- May 25 – 29: 2016 Pan American Men's Club Handball Championship in (Argentina) Buenos Aires
  - (Brazil) Handebol Taubaté defeated fellow Brazilian team, Esporte Pinheiros, 28–23, to win their fourth consecutive Pan American Men's Club Handball Championship title.
  - (Argentina) SAG Villa Ballester took third place.
- June 11 – 19: 2016 Pan American Men's Handball Championship in Buenos Aires
  - Brazil defeated Chile, 28–24, to win their third Pan American Men's Handball Championship title. Argentina took third place.
- November 1 – 5: 2016 Pan American Women's Club Handball Championship in (Chile) Santiago
  - (Brazil) Metodista São Bernardo defeated (Argentina) Ferro Carril Oeste, 29–15, to win the first ever Pan American Women's Club Handball Championship.
  - (Uruguay) Club Atlético Goes took third place.

=== International handball championships ===
- March 18 – 20: 2016 Women's Handball Olympic Qualifying event #1 in Astrakhan
  - Russia and Sweden both qualified to compete at Rio 2016.
- March 18 – 20: 2016 Women's Handball Olympic Qualifying event #2 in Metz
  - France has qualified to compete at Rio 2016.
- March 18 – 20: 2016 Women's Handball Olympic Qualifying event #3 in (Denmark) Aarhus
  - Romania and Montenegro both qualified to compete at Rio 2016.
- April 8 – 10: 2016 Men's Handball Olympic Qualifying event #1 in Gdańsk
  - Tunisia and Poland both qualified to compete at Rio 2016.
- April 8 – 10: 2016 Men's Handball Olympic Qualifying event #2 in Malmö
  - Sweden and Slovenia both qualified to compete at Rio 2016.
- April 8 – 10: 2016 Men's Handball Olympic Qualifying event #3 in Herning
  - Croatia and Denmark both qualified to compete at Rio 2016.
- June 27 – July 3: 2016 World University Handball Championship in Antequera
  - Men: Romania defeated South Korea, 28–20, in the final. Spain took third place.
  - Women: Spain defeated Romania, 20–14, in the final. Poland took third place.
- July 3 – 15: 2016 Women's Junior World Handball Championship in Moscow
  - Denmark defeated Russia, 32–28 in overtime, to win their second Women's Junior World Handball Championship title.
  - Romania took third place.
- July 12 – 17: 2016 Beach Handball World Championships for Men and Women in (Hungary) Budapest
  - Men: Croatia defeated Brazil, 2–0, to win their second Beach Handball World Championships title. Qatar took third place.
  - Women: Spain defeated Brazil, 2–1, to win their first Women's Beach Handball World Championships title.
  - Norway took third place.
- July 19 – 31: 2016 Women's Youth World Handball Championship in Slovakia
  - Russia defeated Denmark, 30–22, to win their second Women's Youth World Handball Championship title.
  - South Korea took third place.
- September 5 – 8: 2016 IHF Super Globe in (Qatar) Doha
  - (Germany) Füchse Berlin defeated (France) Paris Saint-Germain, 29–28, to win their second consecutive IHF Super Globe title.
  - (Poland) Vive Targi Kielce took third place.

== Kabaddi ==
- Major Leagues
- International Tournaments

== Korfball ==
=== Europe ===
- January 13 – 16: IKF Europa Cup 2016 (final round) in (Hungary) Budapest
  - In the final (Netherlands) PKC/SWKGroep defeated (Belgium) Boeckenberg KC 31–21. (Portugal) NC Benfica took third place.
- January 22 – 24: IKF Europa Shield 2016 in (Germany) Castrop-Rauxel
  - In the final (Spain) Korfbal Club Barcelona defeated (England) Bec Korfball Club 15–14. (Germany) Schweriner-Korfball-Club '67 e.V. took third place.
- June 3 – 5: IKF European Korfball Championship Qualfiquation Round 1 West in (France) Saint-Étienne
  - Turkey and Catalonia are qualify from European Championship.
- June 3 – 5: IKF European Korfball Championship Qualfiquation Round 1 East in (Slovakia) Nitra
  - Poland and Germany are qualify from European Championship.
- August 10 – 13: 1st IKF U15 European Korfball Championship in (Hungary) Dunakeszi
  - The Netherlands defeated the Netherlands 1, 10–7.
- October 22 – 30: 2016 IKF European Korfball Championship in Dordrecht
  - In the final, Netherlands defeated Belgium, 27–14. Catalonia took third place.

=== North America ===
- June 15 – 19: Copa Internacional de Korfball in (Dominican Republic) Santo Domingo

1. Dominican Republic 2. Netherlands 3. Colombia 4. Costa Rica

=== Asia ===
- August 26 – September 3: 4th IKF Asia Korfball Championship in India
  - In the final, Chinese Taipei defeated Hong Kong, 39–14. China took third place.

=== World championships and World Cups ===
- March 18 – 20: U17 Korfball World Cup in Schijndel
  - Netherlands beating the Belgium squad in the final 26–12. England took third place
- March 25 – 27: U19 Korfball World Cup in Leeuwarden
  - Netherlands beating the Belgium squad in the final 22–18. Chinese Taipei took third place
- July 9 – 16: IKF U23 World Korfball Championship in Olomouc
  - Netherlands beating the Chinese Taipei squad in the final 24–16. Czech Republic took third place.

== Lacrosse ==
- July 7 – 16: Under-19 World Lacrosse Championships in (Canada) Coquitlam
  - USA defeated CAN 13–12, to win their eighth consecutive Men's U-19 World Lacrosse Championship. Haudenosaunee took third place.
- July 28 – August 6: 2016 European Lacrosse Championship in (Hungary) Gödöllő
  - England defeated Israel 7–6, to win their fourth consecutive Men's European Lacrosse Championships. FIN took third place.

=== Major League Lacrosse ===
- April 23 – August 20: 2016 Major League Lacrosse season
  - (Colorado) Denver Outlaws defeated Ohio Machine, 19–18.
    - MVP: (Colorado) Eric Law

=== NCAA Lacrosse Championship ===
- May 28 – 30: 2016 NCAA Division I Men's Lacrosse Championship (semifinals and final at Lincoln Financial Field in (Pennsylvania) Philadelphia)
  - North Carolina defeated Maryland 14–13.
    - Most Outstanding Player: (Ontario) Chris Cloutier (North Carolina)
- May 28 & 29: 2016 NCAA Division II Men's Lacrosse Championship in (Pennsylvania) Philadelphia
  - (New York (state)) Le Moyne defeated (South Carolina) Limestone 8–4.
    - Most Outstanding Player: (New York (state)) Brendan Entenmann (Le Moyne)
- May 28 & 29: 2016 NCAA Division III Men's Lacrosse Championship in (Pennsylvania) Philadelphia
  - (Maryland) Salisbury defeated (Massachusetts) Tufts 14–13.
    - Most Outstanding Player: (Maryland) Colin Reymann (Salisbury)
- May 27 – 29: 2016 NCAA Division I Women's Lacrosse Championship (semifinals and final at Talen Energy Stadium in Chester, Pennsylvania)
  - North Carolina defeated Maryland 13–7.
    - Most Outstanding Player: (New Jersey) Aly Messinger (North Carolina)
- May 19 – 21: 2016 NCAA Division II Women's Lacrosse Championship in (Colorado) Denver
  - Florida Southern defeated (New York (state)) Adelphi 8–7.
    - Most Outstanding Player: (Maryland) Taylor Gillis (Florida Southern)
- May 28 & 29: 2016 NCAA Division III Women's Lacrosse Championship in (Pennsylvania) Philadelphia
  - (Vermont) Middlebury defeated (Connecticut) Trinity (CT) 9–5.
    - Most Outstanding Player: (Vermont) Katie Mandigo (Middlebury)

=== NLL ===
- January 1 – June 2016: 2016 NLL season
  - Saskatchewan Rush defeated (New York (state)) Buffalo Bandits, 2–0 in the final.
    - MVP: (Canada) Aaron Bold

=== WCLA ===
- May 4 – 7: 2016 WCLA Division I National Championship in (North Carolina) Winston-Salem
  - In the final (Georgia (U.S. state)) Georgia defeated Minnesota 8–7. Colorado Buffaloes took third place.

Division I Individual Awards

- Most Outstanding Attacker – (Georgia (U.S. state)) Arden Birdwell (Georgia Bulldogs)
- Most Outstanding Midfielder – Allie Thalhuber (Minnesota)
- Most Outstanding Defender – (Georgia (U.S. state)) Meredith Butler Georgia Bulldogs
- Most Outstanding Goalie – Hannah Gilbert (Minnesota)
- May 6 – 7: 2016 WCLA Division II National Championship in (North Carolina) Winston-Salem
  - In the final (Colorado) Denver defeated Utah 11–10. (Maryland) Loyola took third place.

Division II Individual Awards

- Most Outstanding Attacker – (Colorado) Kaitlin Ball (Denver)
- Most Outstanding Midfielder – Audrey Burns (Utah)
- Most Outstanding Defender – (Colorado) Nicole Cosmany (Denver)
- Most Outstanding Goalie – Sasha McKee (Utah)

== Multi-sport events ==
- February 5 – 16: 2016 South Asian Games in Guwahati and Shillong
  - India won both the gold and overall medal tallies.
- March 6 – 11: 2016 Arctic Winter Games in (Denmark) / (Greenland) Nuuk
  - Alaska won both the gold and overall medal tallies.
- June 29 – July 3: 2016 IWAS U23 World Games in (Czech Republic) Prague
  - For results, click here.
- July 10 – 19: 2016 ASEAN University Games in Singapore
  - Thailand won both the gold and overall medal tallies.
- July 12 – 25: 2016 European Universities Games in (Croatia) Zagreb and Rijeka
  - (Croatia) University of Zagreb won both the gold and overall medal tallies.
- July 21 – 29: 2016 ASEAN School Games in Chiang Mai
  - Thailand won both the gold and overall medal tallies.
- September 24 – October 3: 2016 Asian Beach Games in Da Nang
  - Vietnam won both the gold and overall medal tallies.
- November 24 – December 3: 2016 Bolivarian Beach Games in Iquique
  - Chile won both the gold and overall medal tallies.

== Netball ==
International tournaments

Date	Tournament	Winners	Runners up
12–15 May	2016 Netball Europe Open Challenge	Grenada	Republic of Ireland
13–15 May	2016 Netball Europe Open Championships	England	Wales
5–15 April	2016 World University Netball Championship	South Africa	Jamaica
27 Aug–4 Sept	2016 Netball Quad Series	Australia	New Zealand
11–17 September	2016 Taini Jamison Trophy Series	New Zealand	Jamaica
2–5 October	2016 Diamond Challenge	South Africa	Zimbabwe
9–20 October	2016 Constellation Cup	Australia	New Zealand
29–30 October	2016 Fast5 Netball World Series	New Zealand	Australia

Major leagues

Host	League/Competition	Winners	Runners up
Australia/New Zealand	ANZ Championship	Queensland Firebirds	New South Wales Swifts
United Kingdom	Netball Superleague	Surrey Storm	Manchester Thunder

== Olympic Games ==
- February 12 – 21: 2016 Winter Youth Olympics in (Norway) Lillehammer
  - The United States and South Korea won ten gold medals each. However, the United States finished first, due to winning more silver medals than South Korea.
  - Russia won the overall medal tally.
- August 5 – 21: 2016 Summer Olympics in (Brazil) Rio de Janeiro
  - The United States won both the gold and overall medal tallies.

== Paralympic Games ==
- September 7 – 18: 2016 Summer Paralympics in (Brazil) Rio de Janeiro
  - China won both the gold and overall medal tallies.

== Padel ==
International Padel Federation Calendar

=== 2016 World Padel Tour ===
- March 27 – December 14: 2016 World Padel Tour
- March 27 – April 3: (Spain) Gijón Open
  - Winners: (Argentina) Fernando Belasteguín & (Brazil) Pablo de Lima
- April 16 – 24: (Spain) Valencia Master
  - Men's winners: (Spain) Francisco Navarro Compán & (Argentina) Sanyo Gutiérrez
  - Women's winners: (Spain) Alejandra Salazar & (Spain) Marta Marrero
- April 30 – May 8: (Spain) Barcelona Master
  - Men's winners: (Argentina) Fernando Belasteguín & (Brazil) Pablo de Lima
  - Women's winners: (Spain) Patty Llaguno & (Spain) Elisabeth Amatriaín
- May 12 – 14: (Italy) Rome Exhibition
  - Winners: (Spain) Francisco Navarro Compán & (Argentina) Sanyo Gutiérrez
- May 22 – 29: (Spain) Las Rozas de Madrid Open
  - Men's winners: (Argentina) Fernando Belasteguín & (Brazil) Pablo de Lima
  - Women's winners: (Spain) Alejandra Salazar & (Spain) Marta Marrero
- May 30 – June 6: (Portugal) Lisbon Chellenger
  - Winners: (Argentina) Matías Marina & (Spain) Alejandro Ruiz Granados
- June 19 – 26: (Spain) Palma Open
  - Men's winners: (Argentina) Fernando Belasteguín & (Brazil) Pablo de Lima
  - Women's winners: (Spain) Majo Sánchez Alayeto & (Spain) Mapi Sánchez Alayeto
- June 26 – July 3: (Spain) Barcelona Chellenger
  - Men's winners: (Spain) Gonzalo Rubio & (Spain) Javier Ruiz
  - Women's winners: (Argentina) Catalina Tenorio & (Spain) Victoria Iglesias
- July 3 – 10: (Spain) Valladolid Open
  - Men's winners: (Argentina) Fernando Belasteguín & (Brazil) Pablo de Lima
  - Women's winners: (Spain) Majo Sánchez Alayeto & (Spain) Mapi Sánchez Alayeto
- July 24 – 31: (Spain) Gran Canaria Open
  - Men's winners: (Argentina) Fernando Belasteguín & (Brazil) Pablo de Lima
  - Women's winners: (Spain) Alejandra Salazar & (Spain) Marta Marrero
- August 7 – 14: (Spain) Costa del Sol Chellenger
  - Winners: (Argentina) Federico Quiles & (Argentina) Franco Stupaczuk
- August 21 – 28: (Spain) La Nucía Open
  - Men's winners: (Spain) Francisco Navarro Compán & (Argentina) Sanyo Gutiérrez
  - Women's winners: (Spain) Majo Sánchez Alayeto & (Spain) Mapi Sánchez Alayeto
- September 5 – 11: (Monaco) Monte Carlo Master
  - Men's winners: (Argentina) Fernando Belasteguín & (Brazil) Pablo de Lima
  - Women's winners: (Spain) Alejandra Salazar & (Spain) Marta Marrero
- September 11 – 18: (Spain) Madrid Chellenger
  - Winners: (Argentina) Gonzalo Godo Díaz & (Argentina) Luciano Capra
- September 18 – 25: (Spain) Sevilla Open
  - Men's winners: (Argentina) Fernando Belasteguín & (Brazil) Pablo de Lima
  - Women's winners: (Spain) Alejandra Salazar & (Spain) Marta Marrero
- October 9 – 16: (Spain) A Coruña Open
  - Men's winners: (Argentina) Fernando Belasteguín & (Brazil) Pablo de Lima
  - Women's winners: (Spain) Alejandra Salazar & (Spain) Marta Marrero
- October 23 – 30: (Spain) Zaragoza Open
  - Men's winners: (Argentina) Fernando Belasteguín & (Brazil) Pablo de Lima
  - Women's winners: (Spain) Alejandra Salazar & (Spain) Marta Marrero
- November 7 – 13: (Argentina) Buenos Aires Master
  - Men's winners: (Argentina) Fernando Belasteguín & (Brazil) Pablo de Lima
- November 25 – 27: (United States) Miami Exhibition
- November 27 – December 4: (Spain) Basque Country Open
- December 14 – 18: (Spain) Madrid Master (final)

=== World Championship ===
- November 14 – 20: Padel Tennis World Championship in (Portugal) Lisbon
  - Men's winners: (Spain) Álvaro Cepero Rodríguez & (Spain) Juan Lebrón Chincoa
  - Women's winners: (Spain) Alejandra Salazar & (Spain) Marta Marrero

== Roller skating ==
=== FIRS ===
- June 1 – 5: 2016 World Inline Hockey Masters Cup in (Italy) Bolzano
  - Master Cup winner: Czech Republic
  - Veteran Cup winner: Czech Republic
- June 4 – 5: 2016 Inline Alpine Slalom and Parallel Slalom World Championships in (Germany) Unterensingen and (Spain) Villablino
  - Slalom winners: (Germany) Katharina Hoffmann & (Latvia) Kristaps Zvejnieks
  - Parallel Slalom winners: (Germany) Claudia Wittmann & (Germany) Davis Zvejnieks
  - World Cup winners: (Germany) Jana Börsig & (Germany) Marco Walz
- June 12 – 25: 2016 World Inline Hockey Championships in Asiago/Roana
  - Men's: In the final, Czech Republic defeated Italy, 4–0. France took third place.
  - Women's: In the final, Canada defeated United States, 3–1. Switzerland took third place.
  - Junior men: In the final, Czech Republic defeated Italy, 5–4. Switzerland took third place.
  - Junior women: In the final, Spain defeated Italy, 2–0. Canada took third place.
- September 10 – 18: World Roller Speed Skating Championships in (China) Nanjing
  - Colombia won both the gold and overall medal tallies.
- September 24 – October 1: 2016 FIRS Women's Roller Hockey World Cup in (Chile) Iquique
  - In the final, Spain defeated Portugal, after (a.e.t.), 3–2. Argentina took third place.
- September 28 – October 8: Artistic Skating World Championship in Novara
  - Seniors Figures winners: (Germany) Markus Lell (m) / (Argentina) Anabella Mendoz (f)
  - Juniors Figures winners: (United States) Deven Jacobson (m) / (Argentina) Giselle Soler (f)
  - Inline Seniors winners: (Chinese Taipei) Yi-Fan Chen (m) / (United States) Natalie Motley (f)
  - Inline Juniors winners: (United States) Collin Motley (m) / (Russia) Anastasia Nosova (f)
  - Seniors Solo Dance winners: (Italy) Daniel Morandin (m) / (Italy) Silvia Stibilj (f)
  - Juniors Solo Dance winners: (Portugal) José Cruz (m) / (Italy) Martina Camana (f)
  - Senior Couples Dance winners: Italy (Alessandro Spigai & Elena Leoni)
  - Junior Couples Dance winners: United States (Benson Kuan & Cassandra Seidel)
- November 17 – 21: 2016 Inline Freestyle World Championships in (Thailand) Bangkok
  - Free Jump winners: (France) Thomas Rataud (m) / (France) Maëliss Conan (f)
  - Battle Slide winners: (China) Huang Haiyang (m) / (Thailand) Nichakan Chinupun (f)
  - Senior Battle Slalom winners: (Russia) Sergey Timchenko (m) / (Russia) Daria Kuznetsova (f)
  - Junior Battle Slalom winners: (China) Zhang Hao (m) / (China) Liu Jiaxin (f)
  - Senior Classic Slalom winners: (Russia) Sergey Timchenko (m) / (China) Mang Yun (f)
  - Junior Classic Slalom winners: (China) Zhang Hao (m) / (Russia) Sofia Bogdanova (f)
  - Senior Speed Slalom winners: (China) Pan Yusuo (m) / (Italy) Barbara Bossi (f)
  - Junior Speed Slalom winners: (Australia) Pedram Ranjbar Vakili (m) / (Chinese Taipei) Lo Pei Yu (f)

=== CERH ===
- October 24, 2015 – May, 15: 2015–16 CERH European League
  - In the final, (Portugal) S.L. Benfica defeated (Portugal) U.D. Oliveirense, 5–3, to win their second European League.
- October 24, 2015 – May 1: 2015–16 CERS Cup
  - In the final, (Portugal) ÓC Barcelos defeated (Spain) CP Vilafranca, 6–3, to win their second CERS Cup.
- November 29, 2015 – March 20: 2015–16 CERH Women's European Cup
  - In the final, (Spain) CP Voltregà defeated (Spain) Manlleu, after regular game, 4–4 and penalties 2–1, to win their 4th title.
- March 24 – 26: U23 Latin Cup in Follonica
  - 1. Portugal
  - 2. Italy
  - 3. Spain
- April 28 – 30: 2016 Show and Precision European Championships in (Portugal) Matosinhos
  - Italy wins overall gold medals.
- July 11 – 16: 2016 CERH European Championship in Oliveira de Azeméis
  - Portugal defeated Italy, 6–2, to win their twenty one CERH European Championship. Spain took third place.
- August 25 – September 3: 2016 Cadet/Youth/Junior/Senior European Championships in (Germany) Freiburg
  - Italy won both the gold and overall medal tallies.
- November 1 – 5: 2016 Cup of Europe Calderara Di Reno in Italy
  - Spain and Italy won both the gold and overall medal tallies.

== Rugby union ==
=== 2016 Summer Olympics (WR) ===
- March 5 & 6: Aquece Rio International Women's Rugby Sevens 2016 in Rio de Janeiro (Olympic Test Event)
  - Winner: Brazil
  - Second: Argentina
  - Third: Colombia
- June 18 & 19: 2016 Men's Rugby Sevens Final Olympic Qualification Tournament in Fontvieille, Monaco
  - Cup Winner: Spain
  - Cup Second: Samoa
  - Cup Third: Russia
  - Plate winner: Canada
  - Bowl winner: Zimbabwe
  - Shield winner: South Korea
- August 6 – 11: 2016 Summer Olympics (rugby sevens) in (Brazil) Rio de Janeiro
  - Men: (gold) Fiji; (silver) Great Britain; (bronze) South Africa
  - Women: (gold) Australia; (silver) New Zealand; (bronze) Canada

=== International rugby events ===
- February 5 – March 18: 2016 Six Nations Under 20s Championship
  - Champions: Wales (first Six Nations Under 20s Championship title)
  - Second: France
  - Third: Ireland
- February 5 – March 20: 2016 Women's Six Nations Championship
  - Champions: France (fifth Women's Six Nations Championship title)
  - Second: England
  - Third: Ireland
- February 6 – March 6: 2016 Americas Rugby Championship (debut event)
  - Winner: Argentina XV (inaugural Americas Rugby Championship title)
  - Second: United States
  - Third: Canada
- February 6 – March 19: 2016 Six Nations Championship
  - Champions: England (fifth Six Nations Championship title)
  - Grand Slam: England
  - Triple Crown: England
  - Calcutta Cup: England
  - Millennium Trophy: England
  - Centenary Quaich: Ireland
  - Giuseppe Garibaldi Trophy: France
- March 8 – 21: 2016 World Rugby Pacific Challenge in Fiji
  - Champions: Fiji Warriors (sixth World Rugby Pacific Challenge title)
  - Second: Samoa A
  - Third: Tonga A
- June 7 – 25: 2016 World Rugby Under 20 Championship in Manchester
  - England defeated Ireland, 45–21, to win their third World Rugby Under 20 Championship title. Argentina took third place.
- July 6 – 9: 2016 FISU World University Rugby Sevens Championship in (Wales) Swansea
  - Men: Australia defeated Great Britain, 24–20, in the final. France took third place.
  - Women: France defeated Canada, 31–5, in the final. Japan took third place.
- August 27 – October 8: 2016 Rugby Championship
  - Winner: New Zealand; 2. Australia; 3. South Africa; 4. Argentina
- November 5: 2016 Oceania Rugby Women's Championship in Fiji

==== 2016 Men's Internationals ====
- April 30 – June 26: WR's 2016 Men's Internationals Page

==== 2016 Women's Internationals ====
- October 22 – December 17: WR's 2016 Women's Internationals Page

=== 2015–16 World Rugby Sevens Series ===
- Overall champions: Fiji
- Second: South Africa
- Third: New Zealand

=== 2015–16 World Rugby Women's Sevens Series ===
- Overall champions: Australia
- Second: New Zealand
- Third: Canada

=== Club seasons and championships ===
- November 13, 2015 – May 14: 2015–16 European Rugby Champions Cup
  - Final in (France) Décines: (England) Saracens defeated (France) Racing 92 21–9 for their first-ever European club title.
- November 12, 2015 – May 13: 2016–17 European Rugby Challenge Cup
  - Final in (France) Décines: (France) Montpellier defeated (England) Harlequins 26–19 for their first-ever Challenge Cup title.
- October 16, 2015 – May 28: (England) 2015–16 Aviva Premiership
  - Final in London: Saracens defeated Exeter Chiefs 28–20 for their second straight title and third overall.
- September 5, 2015 – May 28: (Ireland) / (Italy) / (Scotland) / (Wales) 2015–16 Guinness Pro12
  - Grand Final in (Scotland) Edinburgh: In a matchup of Irish teams, Connacht defeated Leinster 20–10 for their first-ever championship.
- August 22, 2015 – June 4: 2015–16 Top 14
  - Final in (Spain) Barcelona: In a match moved from its traditional site of Stade de France due to scheduling conflicts with UEFA Euro 2016, Racing 92 defeated Toulon 29–21 for their first title since 1990 and sixth overall. The crowd of 99,124 was the largest ever for a domestic club match in the sport's history.
- February 26 – August 6: (Australia) // (South Africa) / (Argentina) / (Japan) 2016 Super Rugby season
  - Final in Wellington: In a matchup between teams from New Zealand's North Island, the Hurricanes defeated the Blues 20–3 for their second straight title, and also second overall.

== Shooting ==
- January 4 – November 20: ISSF Competition Calendar

=== 2016 Summer Olympics (ISSF) ===
- August 6 – 14: 2016 Summer Olympics in (Brazil) Rio de Janeiro at the National Shooting Center
  - Men
  - Men's 10 metre Air Pistol: (gold) (Vietnam) Hoàng Xuân Vinh (OR); (silver) (Brazil) Felipe Almeida Wu; (bronze) (China) Pang Wei
  - Men's 10 metre Air Rifle: (gold) (Italy) Niccolò Campriani (OR); (silver) (Ukraine) Serhiy Kulish; (bronze) (Russia) Vladimir Maslennikov
  - Men's 25 metre Rapid Fire Pistol: (gold) (Germany) Christian Reitz; (silver) (France) Jean Quiquampoix; (bronze) (China) Li Yuehong
  - Men's 50 metre Pistol: (gold) (South Korea) Jin Jong-oh (OR); (silver) (Vietnam) Hoàng Xuân Vinh; (bronze) (North Korea) Kim Song-guk
  - Men's 50 metre Rifle Prone: (gold) (Germany) Henri Junghänel (OR); (silver) (South Korea) Kim Jong-hyun; (bronze) (Russia) Kirill Grigoryan
  - Men's 50 metre Rifle Three Positions: (gold) (Italy) Niccolò Campriani; (silver) (Russia) Sergey Kamenskiy; (bronze) (France) Alexis Raynaud
  - Men's Skeet: (gold) (Italy) Gabriele Rossetti; (silver) (Sweden) Marcus Svensson; (bronze) (International Olympic Committee) Abdullah Al-Rashidi (Kuwait)
  - Men's Trap: (gold) (Croatia) Josip Glasnović; (silver) (Italy) Giovanni Pellielo; (bronze) (United Kingdom) Edward Ling
  - Men's Double Trap: (gold) (International Olympic Committee) Fehaid Al-Deehani (Kuwait); (silver) (Italy) Marco Innocenti; (bronze) (United Kingdom) Steven Scott
  - Women
  - Women's 10 metre Air Pistol: (gold) (China) Zhang Mengxue (OR); (silver) (Russia) Vitalina Batsarashkina; (bronze) (Greece) Anna Korakaki
  - Women's 10 metre Air Rifle: (gold) (United States) Virginia Thrasher (OR); (silver) (China) Du Li; (bronze) (China) Yi Siling
  - Women's 25 metre Pistol: (gold) (Greece) Anna Korakaki; (silver) (Germany) Monika Karsch; (bronze) (Switzerland) Heidi Diethelm Gerber
  - Women's 50 metre Rifle Three Positions: (gold) (Germany) Barbara Engleder; (silver) (China) Zhang Binbin; (bronze) (China) Du Li
  - Women's Skeet: (gold) (Italy) Diana Bacosi; (silver) (Italy) Chiara Cainero; (bronze) (United States) Kim Rhode
  - Women's Trap: (gold) (Australia) Catherine Skinner; (silver) (New Zealand) Natalie Rooney; (bronze) (United States) Corey Cogdell

=== International shooting championships ===
- January 25 – February 3: 2016 Asian Olympic Shooting Qualifying Tournament in (India) New Delhi
  - Note: This event was named as the alternate qualification one for Rio 2016 from the one staged in Kuwait last year.
  - Japan won the gold medal tally. South Korea won the overall medal tally.
- February 22 – 28: 10m European Shooting Championships in (Hungary) Győr
  - Russia won both the gold and overall medal tallies.
- June 13 – 19: 2016 European Junior Shooting Championships in (Estonia) Tallinn
  - Germany won both the gold and overall medal tallies.
- July 4 – 12: 2016 European Shotgun Championships in Lonato del Garda
  - Italy won both the gold and overall medal tallies.
- July 15 – 23: 2016 World Running Target Championships in (Germany) Suhl
  - Ukraine won the gold medal tally. Ukraine and Russia won 15 overall medals each.
- September 14 – 18: 2016 World University Shooting Championship in (Poland) Bydgoszcz
  - India won the gold medal tally. India and the Czech Republic won 7 overall medals each.

=== 2016 ISSF World Cup ===
- March 1 – 9: Rifle and Pistol World Cup #1 in (Thailand) Bangkok
  - China won both the gold and overall medal tallies.
- March 17 – 25: Shotgun World Cup #1 in (Cyprus) Nicosia
  - Men's skeet winner: (Ukraine) Mykola Milchev
  - Men's trap winner: (Spain) Alberto Fernández
  - Men's double trap winner: (Italy) Alessandro Chianese
  - Women's skeet winner: (United States) Morgan Craft
  - Women's trap winner: (Lebanon) Ray Bassil
- April 13 – 25: All Guns World Cup #1 in (Brazil) Rio de Janeiro (Olympic Test Event)
  - China, Spain, Russia, and Ukraine won 2 gold medals each. China won the overall medal tally.
- May 19 – 26: Rifle and Pistol World Cup #2 in (Germany) Munich
  - China won both the gold and overall medal tallies.
- June 1 – 11: Shotgun World Cup #2 in the City of San Marino
  - Men's skeet winner: (Sweden) Stefan Nilsson
  - Men's trap winner: (Czech Republic) Jiří Lipták
  - Men's double trap winner: (United States) Joshua Richmond
  - Women's skeet winner: (Thailand) Sutiya Jiewchaloemmit
  - Women's trap winner: (Australia) Emma Elizabeth Cox
- June 20 – 29: All Guns World Cup #2 (final) in (Azerbaijan) Baku
  - Croatia won the gold medal tally. South Korea won the overall medal tally.
- October 4 – 10: Rifle and Pistol World Cup #3 (final) in (Italy) Bologna
  - China and Serbia won 2 gold medals each. China won the overall medal tally.
- October 10 – 16: Shotgun World Cup #3 (final) in (Italy) Rome
  - Men's skeet winner: (Russia) Nikolai Tiopliy
  - Men's trap winner: (Croatia) Giovanni Cernogoraz
  - Men's double trap winner: (Australia) James Willett
  - Women's skeet winner: (United States) Kim Rhode
  - Women's trap winner: (New Zealand) Natalie Rooney

== Snooker ==
=== Players Tour Championship ===
- June 16, 2015 – March 26, 2016: Players Tour Championship 2015/2016
- July 29 – August 2: European Tour 2015/2016 – Event 1 in (Latvia) Riga
  - (England) Barry Hawkins defeated (England) Tom Ford 4–1.
- August 26 – 30: European Tour – Event 2 in (Germany) Fürth
  - (England) Ali Carter defeated (England) Shaun Murphy 4–3.
- October 7 – 11: European Tour – Event 3 in (Germany) Mülheim
  - (England) Rory McLeod defeated (China) Tian Pengfei 4–2.
- October 19 – 23: Asian Tour – Event 1 in (China) Haining
  - (China) Ding Junhui defeated (England) Ricky Walden 4–3.
- November 4 – 8: European Tour – Event 4 in (Bulgaria) Sofia
  - (Northern Ireland) Mark Allen defeated (Wales) Ryan Day 4–0.
- December 9 – 13: European Tour – Event 5 in Gibraltar
  - (Hong Kong) Marco Fu defeated (Wales) Michael White 4–1.
- February 23 – 28: European Tour – Event 6 in (Poland) Gdynia
  - (England) Mark Selby defeated (England) Martin Gould 4–1.
- March 22 – 27: Players Tour Championship – Finals in Manchester
  - (Northern Ireland) Mark Allen defeated (England) Ricky Walden 10–6.

=== Snooker season ===
- May 7, 2015 – May 2, 2016: Snooker season 2015/2016
- May 7, 2015 – May 10, 2015: Vienna Snooker Open in (Austria) Vienna
  - (England) Peter Ebdon defeated (England) Mark King 5–3.
- June 22, 2015 – June 26, 2015: World Cup in Wuxi
  - China defeated Scotland 4–1
- July 29 – July 5: 2015 Australian Goldfields Open in (Australia) Bendigo
  - (Scotland) John Higgins defeated (England) Martin Gould 9–8.
- July 15 – 19: Pink Ribbon in (England) Gloucester
  - (England) Ronnie O'Sullivan defeated (England) Darryn Walker 4–2
- September 7 – 12: Six-red World Championship in (Thailand) Bangkok
  - (Thailand) Thepchaiya Un-Nooh defeated (China) Liang Wenbo 8–2.
- September 14 – 20: Shanghai Masters in (China) Shanghai
  - (England) Kyren Wilson defeated (England) Judd Trump 10–9.
- October 25 – November 1: 2015 International Championship in (China) Daqing
  - (Scotland) John Higgins defeated (England) David Gilbert 10–5.
- November 10 – 15: 2015 Champion of Champions in (England) Coventry
  - (Australia) Neil Robertson defeated (Northern Ireland) Mark Allen 10–5.
- November 10–21: 2015 IBSF World Snooker Championship in (Egypt) Hurghada
  - (India) Pankaj Advani defeated (China) Zhao Xintong 8–6.
- November 16–21: 2015 General Cup in Hong Kong
  - (Hong Kong) Marco Fu defeated (Wales) Mark Williams 7–3.
- November 24 – December 6: 2015 UK Championship in (England) York
  - (Australia) Neil Robertson defeated (China) Liang Wenbo 10–5.
- January 10 – 17: 2016 Masters in (England) London
  - (England) Ronnie O'Sullivan defeated (England) Barry Hawkins 10–1.
- January 30 & 31: 2016 World Seniors Championship in (England) Preston
  - (England) Mark Davis defeated (Wales) Darren Morgan 2–1.
- February 3 – 7: 2016 German Masters in (Germany) Berlin
  - (England) Martin Gould def. (Belgium) Luca Brecel 9–5.
- February 12 – 14: 2016 Snooker Shoot-Out in (England) Reading
  - (Finland) Robin Hull def. (Belgium) Luca Brecel 1–0
- February 15 – 21: 2016 Welsh Open in (Wales) Cardiff
  - (England) Ronnie O'Sullivan defeated (Australia) Neil Robertson 9–5.
- January 4 – March 4: 2016 Championship League (final) in (England) Stock
  - (England) Judd Trump defeated (England) Ronnie O'Sullivan 3–2.
- March 8 – 13: 2016 World Grand Prix in (Wales) Llandudno
  - (England) Shaun Murphy defeated (England) Stuart Bingham 10–9.
- March 28 – April 3: 2016 China Open in Beijing
  - (England) Judd Trump defeated (England) Ricky Walden 10–4.
- April 16 – May 2: 2016 World Snooker Championship in (England) Sheffield
  - (England) Mark Selby defeated (China) Ding Junhui 18–14.

=== Others in snooker ===
- June 2 – 13: 2015 EBSA European Snooker Championship in (Czech Republic) Prague
  - (England) Michael Wild defeated (Wales) Jamie Clarke 7–4.
- July 18 – 26: 2015 IBSF World Under-21 Snooker Championship in (Romania) Bucharest
  - (Thailand) Boonyarit Keattikun defeated (Wales) Jamie Clarke 7–6.
- October 3 – 11: 2015 IBSF World Under-18 Snooker Championship in (Russia) St. Petersburg
  - (Hong Kong) Ka Wai Cheung defeated (Hong Kong) Ming Tung Chan 5–2.
- February 7 – 12: 2016 EBSA European Under-18 Snooker Championship in (Poland) Wrocław
  - (Wales) Tyler Rees defeated (Wales) Jackson Page 5–2.
- February 7 – 12: 2016 EBSA European Under-21 Snooker Championship in (Poland) Wrocław
  - (Republic of Ireland) Josh Boileau defeated (England) Brandon Sargeant 6–1.
- February 12 – 21: 2016 EBSA European Snooker Championship in (Poland) Wrocław
  - (Wales) Jak Jones defeated (Wales) Jamie Clarke 7–4.
- March 1 – 8: 2016 ACBS Asian Under-21 Snooker Championship in (Sri Lanka) Colombo
  - (China) Wang Yuchen defeated (Thailand) Ratchayothin Yotharuck 6–5.

== Softball ==
=== Softball World Cup and Championships ===
- July 5 – 10: 2016 World Cup of Softball in Oklahoma City
  - Japan defeated the United States, 2–1, to win their third World Cup of Softball title. Australia took the bronze medal.
- July 15 – 24: 2016 Women's Softball World Championship in Surrey, British Columbia
  - The United States defeated Japan, 7–3, to win their tenth Women's Softball World Championship title.
  - Canada took the bronze medal.
- July 22 – 30: 2016 ISF Junior Men's World Championship in (United States) Midland, Michigan
  - Japan defeated New Zealand, 2–1, to win their second ISF Junior Men's World Championship title. Canada took the bronze medal.

=== Little League Softball ===
- July 31 – August 6: 2016 Junior League Softball in (Washington (state)) Kirkland, Washington
  - (Puerto Rico) ASOFEM LL (Team Latin America) defeated (British Columbia) Hampton LL (Team Canada), 8–6, in the final.
- July 31 – August 7: 2016 Senior League Softball in Sussex County, Delaware
  - (Florida) Cape Coral Softball LL (Team Southeast) defeated (British Columbia) District 7 (Team Canada), 3–0, in the final.
- July 31 – August 7: 2016 Big League Softball in (Delaware) Sussex County
  - (Puerto Rico) District 1 (Team Latin America) defeated (Louisiana) District 5 (Team Southwest), 10–7, in the final.
- August 10 – 17: 2016 Little League Softball in Portland, Oregon
  - (Texas) Greater Helotes LL (Team Southwest) defeated (North Carolina) Rowan LL (Team Southeast), 5–1, in the final.

== Tennis ==
- January 3 – November 27: 2016 ATP World Tour (Men)
- January 3 – November 20: 2016 WTA Tour (Women)

=== 2016 Summer Olympics (ATP and WTA) ===
- August 6 – 14: 2016 Summer Olympics in (Brazil) Rio de Janeiro at the Olympic Tennis Centre
  - Men's Singles: (gold) (United Kingdom) Andy Murray; (silver) (Argentina) Juan Martín del Potro; (bronze) (Japan) Kei Nishikori
  - Men's Doubles:
  - (gold) Spain (Marc López & Rafael Nadal)
  - (silver) Romania (Florin Mergea & Horia Tecău)
  - (bronze) United States (Steve Johnson & Jack Sock)
  - Women's Singles: (gold) (Puerto Rico) Monica Puig; (silver) (Germany) Angelique Kerber; (bronze) (Czech Republic) Petra Kvitová
  - Women's Doubles:
  - (gold) Russia (Ekaterina Makarova & Elena Vesnina)
  - (silver) Switzerland (Timea Bacsinszky & Martina Hingis)
  - (bronze) Czech Republic (Lucie Šafářová & Barbora Strýcová)
  - Mixed Doubles:
  - (gold) United States (Bethanie Mattek-Sands & Jack Sock)
  - (silver) United States (Venus Williams & Rajeev Ram)
  - (bronze) Czech Republic (Lucie Hradecká & Radek Štěpánek)

=== International tennis competitions ===
- January 3 – 9: 2016 Hopman Cup in Perth
  - Australia defeated Ukraine, 2–0 in matches played, to win their second Hopman Cup title.
- February 1 – November 13: 2016 Fed Cup
  - The Czech Republic defeated France, 3–2 in matches played, to win their third consecutive and tenth overall Fed Cup title.
- March 5 – November 28: 2016 Davis Cup
  - Argentina defeated Croatia, 3–2 in matches played, to win their first Davis Cup title.
- October 23 – 30: 2016 WTA Finals in Singapore
  - Women's Singles: (Slovakia) Dominika Cibulková
  - Women's Doubles: (Russia) Ekaterina Makarova / (Russia) Elena Vesnina
- November 1 – 6: 2016 WTA Elite Trophy in (China) Zhuhai
  - Women's Singles: (Czech Republic) Petra Kvitová
  - Women's Doubles: (Turkey) İpek Soylu / (China) Xu Yifan
- November 13 – 20: 2016 ATP World Tour Finals in (United Kingdom) London
  - Men's Singles: (United Kingdom) Andy Murray
  - Men's Doubles: (Finland) Henri Kontinen / (Australia) John Peers

=== Grand Slam ===
- January 18 – 31: 2016 Australian Open in (Australia) Melbourne
  - Men's Singles: (Serbia) Novak Djokovic
  - Men's Doubles: (United Kingdom) Jamie Murray / (Brazil) Bruno Soares
  - Women's Singles: (Germany) Angelique Kerber
  - Women's Doubles: (Switzerland) Martina Hingis / (India) Sania Mirza
- May 16 – June 5: 2016 French Open in (France) Paris
  - Men's Singles: (Serbia) Novak Djokovic
  - Men's Doubles: (Spain) Feliciano López / (Spain) Marc López
  - Women's Singles: (Spain) Garbiñe Muguruza
  - Women's Doubles: (France) Caroline Garcia / (France) Kristina Mladenovic
- June 27 – July 10: 2016 Wimbledon Championships in (United Kingdom) London
  - Men's Singles: (United Kingdom) Andy Murray
  - Men's Doubles: (France) Pierre-Hugues Herbert / (France) Nicolas Mahut
  - Women's Singles: (United States) Serena Williams
  - Women's Doubles: (United States) Serena Williams / (United States) Venus Williams
- August 29 – September 11: 2016 US Open in (United States) New York City
  - Men's Singles: (Switzerland) Stan Wawrinka
  - Men's Doubles: (United Kingdom) Jamie Murray / (Brazil) Bruno Soares
  - Women's Singles: (Germany) Angelique Kerber
  - Women's Doubles: (United States) Bethanie Mattek-Sands / (Czech Republic) Lucie Šafářová
