= NCAA Lacrosse Championship =

NCAA Lacrosse Championship may refer to:

- NCAA Men's Lacrosse Championship, the tournament determines the top Men's Field Lacrosse team in the NCAA Division I, Division II, and Division III.
- NCAA Women's Lacrosse Championship, the tournament determines the top women's lacrosse team in the NCAA Division I, Division II, and Division III.
