= March 2016 in sports =

| << | March 2016 | | | | | >> |
| Su | Mo | Tu | We | Th | Fr | Sa |
| | | 1 | 2 | 3 | 4 | 5 |
| 6 | 7 | 8 | 9 | 10 | 11 | 12 |
| 13 | 14 | 15 | 16 | 17 | 18 | 19 |
| 20 | 21 | 22 | 23 | 24 | 25 | 26 |
| 27 | 28 | 29 | 30 | 31 |
Sports

This list shows notable sports-related events and notable outcomes that occurred in March of 2016.

== Events calendar ==
| Date | Sport | Venue/Event | Status | Winner/s |
|---|---|---|---|---|
| 1–6 | Archery | (Turkey) 2016 World Indoor Archery Championships | International | Italy |
| 1–12 | Cross-country skiing | 2016 Ski Tour Canada | International | Men: (Norway) Martin Johnsrud Sundby; Women: (Norway) Therese Johaug |
| 2–6 | Track cycling | (United Kingdom) 2016 UCI Track Cycling World Championships | International | Great Britain |
| 3–6 | Golf | (United States) 2016 WGC-Cadillac Championship | International | (Australia) Adam Scott |
| 3–13 | Association football | (Grenada) 2016 CONCACAF Women's U-17 Championship | Continental | United States |
| 3–13 | Biathlon | (Norway) Biathlon World Championships 2016 | International | France |
| 4–5 | Triathlon | (United Arab Emirates) 2016 ITU World Triathlon Series #1 | International | Men: (Spain) Mario Mola; Women: (United Kingdom) Jodie Stimpson |
| 4–6 | Amateur wrestling | (Egypt) 2016 African Wrestling Championships | Continental | Men's Freestyle: Tunisia; Women's Freestyle: Nigeria; Greco-Roman: Egypt |
| 4–6 | Darts | (England) 2016 UK Open | International | (Netherlands) Michael van Gerwen |
| 4–6 | Rugby sevens | (United States) 2016 USA Sevens (WRSS #5) | International | Fiji |
| 5–6 | Speed skating | (Germany) 2016 World Allround Speed Skating Championships | International | Men: (Netherlands) Sven Kramer; Women: (Czech Republic) Martina Sáblíková |
| 5–13 | Curling | (Denmark) 2016 World Junior Curling Championships | International | Men: Scotland (Skip: Bruce Mouat); Women: Canada (Skip: Mary Fay) |
| 6–12 | Multi-sport | (Denmark) / (Greenland) 2016 Arctic Winter Games | Regional | Alaska |
| 8–13 | Amateur wrestling | (Latvia) 2016 European Wrestling Championships | Continental | Men's freestyle: Russia (medals), Georgia (points); Women's freestyle: Azerbaijan (medals), Ukraine (points); Greco-Roman: Russia (medals and points); Overall: Russia (medals), Ukraine (points) |
| 8–13 | Snooker | (Wales) 2016 World Grand Prix | International | (England) Shaun Murphy |
| 8–3 April | Cricket | (India) 2016 ICC World Twenty20 | International | West Indies |
| 9–20 | Tennis | (United States) 2016 BNP Paribas Open | International | Men: (Serbia) Novak Djokovic; Women: (Belarus) Victoria Azarenka |
| 11–12 | Amateur wrestling | (New Zealand) 2016 Oceania Wrestling Championships | Continental | Men's Freestyle: New Zealand; Women's Freestyle: Australia; Greco-Roman: New Zealand |
| 11–13 | Athletics | (Italy) 2016 World University Cross Country Championships | International | Men: (Morocco) Hicham Amghar; Women: (Turkey) Sevilay Eytemiş |
| 11–13 | Speed skating | (China) 2016 World Junior Speed Skating Championships | International | Men: (Canada) Benjamin Donnelly; Women: (Russia) Elizaveta Kazelina |
| 11–13 | Speed skating | (South Korea) 2016 World Short Track Speed Skating Championships | International | Men: (China) Han Tianyu; Women: (South Korea) Choi Min-jeong |
| 11–30 | Chess | (Russia) Candidates Tournament 2016 | International | (Russia) Sergey Karjakin |
| 12 | Triathlon | (Australia) ITU Triathlon World Cup #1 | International | Men: (Spain) Mario Mola; Women: (United Kingdom) Jodie Stimpson |
| 12 | Formula E | 2016 Mexico City ePrix | International | (Belgium) Jérôme d'Ambrosio ( (United States) Dragon Racing) |
| 12–13 | Rugby sevens | 2016 Canada Sevens (WRSS #6) | International | New Zealand |
| 13–18 September | INDYCAR | (United States) / (Canada) 2016 IndyCar Series | Regional | (France) Simon Pagenaud ( (United States) Team Penske) |
| 14–20 | Figure skating | (Hungary) 2016 World Junior Figure Skating Championships | International | Men: (Israel) Daniel Samohin; Ladies: (Japan) Marin Honda; Pairs: (Czech Republic) Anna Dušková / Martin Bidař; Ice Dance: (United States) Lorraine McNamara / Quinn Carpenter |
| 14–20 | Ice hockey | (Bulgaria) 2016 IIHF World U18 Championships Division III – Group A | International | Australia was promoted to Division II – Group B Mexico was relegated to Division III – Group B |
| 15–3 April | Cricket | (India) 2016 ICC Women's World Twenty20 | International | West Indies |
| 15–4 April | Basketball | (United States) 2016 NCAA Men's Division I Basketball Tournament | Domestic | (Pennsylvania) Villanova Wildcats |
| 16–20 | Modern pentathlon | (Argentina) 2016 Pan American Modern Pentathlon Championships | Continental | Men: (United States) Nathan Schrimsher; Women: (Cuba) Leidis Laura Moya |
| 17–20 | Athletics | (United States) 2016 IAAF World Indoor Championships | International | United States |
| 19–27 | Curling | (Canada) 2016 Ford World Women's Curling Championship | International | Switzerland (Skip: Binia Feltscher) |
| 19–5 April | Basketball | (United States) 2016 NCAA Women's Division I Basketball Tournament | Domestic | Connecticut Huskies |
| 20 | Formula One | (Australia) 2016 Australian Grand Prix | International | (Germany) Nico Rosberg ( (Germany) Mercedes) |
| 20 | Motorcycle racing | 2016 Qatar motorcycle Grand Prix | International | MotoGP: (Spain) Jorge Lorenzo ( (Japan) Movistar Yamaha MotoGP); Moto2: (Switzerland) Thomas Lüthi ( (Switzerland) Garage Plus Interwetten); Moto3: (Italy) Niccolò Antonelli ( (Italy) Ongetta-Rivacold) |
| 20–24 | Table tennis | (Australia) 2016 Oceania Table Tennis Championships | Continental | Men: (Australia) Chris Yan; Women: (Australia) Jian Fang Lay |
| 21–27 | Squash | (England) 2016 Men's British Open (PSA WS #6) (England) 2016 Women's British Open | International | Men: (Egypt) Mohamed El Shorbagy; Women: (Egypt) Nour El Sherbini |
| 21–3 April | Tennis | (United States) 2016 Miami Open | International | Men: (Serbia) Novak Djokovic; Women: (Belarus) Victoria Azarenka |
| 23–27 | Golf | (United States) 2016 WGC-Dell Match Play | International | (Australia) Jason Day |
| 25–27 | Rowing | (Chile) 2016 South American Rowing Championship | Continental | Brazil |
| 26 | Athletics | (United Kingdom) 2016 IAAF World Half Marathon Championships | International | Men: (Kenya) Geoffrey Kipsang Kamworor; Women: (Kenya) Peres Jepchirchir |
| 26 | Horse racing | (United Arab Emirates) 2016 Dubai World Cup | International | (United States) California Chrome (Jockey: (Mexico) Victor Espinoza) |
| 26–31 | Ice hockey | (Denmark) 2016 IIHF Women's World Championship Division I – Group A | International | Germany was promoted to Top Division; Slovakia was relegated to Division I - Group B |
| 26–1 April | Ice hockey | (Spain) 2016 IIHF World U18 Championships Division II – Group B | International | Estonia was promoted to Division II - Group A China was relegated to Division III - Group A |
| 28–3 April | Figure skating | (United States) 2016 World Figure Skating Championships | International | Men: (Spain) Javier Fernández; Ladies: (Russia) Evgenia Medvedeva; Pairs: (Canada) Meagan Duhamel/Eric Radford; Ice Dance: (France) Gabriella Papadakis/Guillaume Cizeron |
| 28–3 April | Snooker | 2016 China Open | International | (England) Judd Trump |
| 28–4 April | Ice hockey | (Canada) 2016 IIHF Women's World Championship | International | United States |
| 31–3 April | Golf | (United States) 2016 ANA Inspiration | International | (New Zealand) Lydia Ko |
| 31–6 April | Ice hockey | (Turkey) 2016 IIHF World Championship Division III | International | Turkey was promoted to Division II - Group B |
