= February 2016 in sports =

<<	February 2016					>>
Su	Mo	Tu	We	Th	Fr	Sa
	1	2	3	4	5	6
7	8	9	10	11	12	13
14	15	16	17	18	19	20
21	22	23	24	25	26	27
28	29
Sports

This list shows notable sports-related events and notable outcomes that occurred in February of 2016.

== Events calendar ==
Date	Sport	Venue/Event	Status	Winner/s
2–13	Futsal	(Serbia) UEFA Futsal Euro 2016	Continental	Spain
2–27 July	Association football	2016 Copa Libertadores	Continental	(Colombia) Atlético Nacional
3–7	Snooker	(Germany) 2016 German Masters	International	(England) Martin Gould
5–16	Multi-sport	(India) 2016 South Asian Games	International	India
6	Formula E	(Argentina) 2016 Buenos Aires ePrix	International	(United Kingdom) Sam Bird ( (United Kingdom) Virgin Racing)
6–7	Luge	(Germany) 2016 FIL Junior World Championships	International	Men: (Russia) Roman Repilov; Women: Julia Taubitz; Doubles: (Austria) David Trojer/Philip Knoll; Team: Germany
6–7	Rugby sevens	(Australia) 2016 Sydney Sevens (WRSS #4)	International	New Zealand
6–6 March	Rugby union	(Argentina) / (Brazil) / (Canada) / (Chile) / (United States) / (Uruguay) 2016 Americas Rugby Championship	Continental	Argentina XV
6–19 March	Rugby union	(England) / (France) / (Ireland) / (Italy) / (Scotland) / (Wales) 2016 Six Nations Championship	Continental	England
7	American football	(United States) Super Bowl 50	Domestic	(Colorado) Denver Broncos; MVP: (Texas) Von Miller (Denver Broncos)
7–13	Snooker	(Poland) 2016 European Under-18 Snooker Championship (Poland) 2016 European Under-21 Snooker Championship	Continental	U-18: (Wales) Tyler Rees; U-21: (Republic of Ireland) Josh Boileau
8–13	Futsal	(Fiji) 2016 OFC Futsal Championship	Continental	Solomon Islands
8–21	Bobsleigh & Skeleton	(Austria) IBSF World Championships 2016	International	Germany
10–21	Futsal	(Uzbekistan) 2016 AFC Futsal Championship	Continental	Iran
11–14	Speed skating	(Russia) 2016 World Single Distance Speed Skating Championships	International	Netherlands
12–14	Canoe sprint	(Australia) 2016 Oceania Canoe Sprint Championships	Continental	Australia
12–21	Multi-sport	(Norway) 2016 Winter Youth Olympics	International	United States
12–23 October	Association football	2016 CAF Champions League	Continental	(South Africa) Mamelodi Sundowns
12–6 November	Association football	2016 CAF Confederation Cup	Continental	(Democratic Republic of the Congo) TP Mazembe
13–14	Luge	(Germany) 2016 FIL European Luge Championships	Continental	Men: Felix Loch; Women: Tatjana Hüfner; Doubles: Toni Eggert & Sascha Benecken; Team Relay: Germany
14	Basketball	(Canada) 2016 NBA All-Star Game	Domestic	Western Conference (NBA); MVP: (California) Russell Westbrook ( Oklahoma City Thunder)
15–19	Ice hockey	(South Africa) 2016 IIHF World U18 Championships Division III – Group B	International	New Zealand was promoted to Division III – Group A
15–21	Snooker	(Wales) 2016 Welsh Open	International	(England) Ronnie O'Sullivan
16–21	Figure skating	(Chinese Taipei) 2016 Four Continents Figure Skating Championships	International	Men: (Canada) Patrick Chan; Ladies: (Japan) Satoko Miyahara; Pairs: (China) Sui Wenjing/Han Cong; Ice dance: (United States) Maia Shibutani/Alex Shibutani
17–21	Amateur wrestling	(Thailand) 2016 Asian Wrestling Championships	Continental	Men's freestyle: Iran; Greco-Roman: Iran; Women's freestyle: China; Overall: Iran
19–21	Whitewater slalom	(Australia) 2016 Oceania Canoe Slalom Championships	Continental	Slovakia
20	Association football	(Democratic Republic of the Congo) 2016 CAF Super Cup	Continental	(Democratic Republic of the Congo) TP Mazembe
21–28	Curling	(Switzerland) 2016 World Wheelchair Curling Championship	International	Russia (Skip: Andrey Smirnov)
22–28	Biathlon	(Russia) 2016 IBU Open European Championships	Continental	Russia
22–28	Shooting	(Hungary) 10m European Shooting Championships	Continental	Russia
25–2 March	Squash	(United States) Windy City Open 2016 (PSA WS #5) (United States) Women's Windy City Open 2016	International	Men: (Egypt) Mohamed El Shorbagy; Women: (Egypt) Raneem El Weleily
26–28	Amateur wrestling	(United States) 2016 Pan-American Wrestling Championships	Continental	Men's Freestyle: United States; Women's Freestyle: United States; Greco-Roman: Cuba
26–6 August	Rugby union	(Argentina) / (Australia) / (New Zealand) / (Japan) / (South Africa) 2016 Super Rugby season	International	(New Zealand) Hurricanes
27–28	Speed skating	(South Korea) 2016 World Sprint Speed Skating Championships	International	Men: (Russia) Pavel Kulizhnikov; Women: (United States) Brittany Bowe
28	Marathon	(Japan) 2016 Tokyo Marathon (WMM #1)	International	Men: (Ethiopia) Feyisa Lilesa; Women: (Kenya) Helah Kiprop
28–6 March	Table tennis	(Malaysia) 2016 World Team Table Tennis Championships	International	China
29–6 March	Ice hockey	(Spain) 2016 IIHF Women's World Championship Division II – Group B	International	Australia was promoted to Division II – Group A Turkey was relegated to Division II – Group B Qualification
