= January 2016 in sports =

<<	January 2016					>>
Su	Mo	Tu	We	Th	Fr	Sa
					1	2
3	4	5	6	7	8	9
10	11	12	13	14	15	16
17	18	19	20	21	22	23
24	25	26	27	28	29	30
31
Sports

This list shows notable sports-related events and notable outcomes that occurred in January 2016.

== Events calendar ==
Date	Sport	Venue/Event	Status	Winner/s
1	Ice hockey	(United States) 2016 NHL Winter Classic	Domestic	(Canada) Montreal Canadiens
1–10	Cross-country skiing	(Switzerland) / (Germany) / (Italy) 2016 Tour de Ski	International	Men: (Norway) Martin Johnsrud Sundby; Women: (Norway) Therese Johaug
17 December 2015–3	Darts	(England) 2016 PDC World Darts Championship	International	(Scotland) Gary Anderson
3–9	Tennis	(Australia) 2016 Hopman Cup	International	Australia (Nick Kyrgios / Daria Gavrilova)
3–12	Association football	(Russia) 2016 Granatkin Memorial	International	Slovenia
3–16	Rallying	(Argentina) / (Bolivia) 2016 Dakar Rally	International	Bikes: (Australia) Toby Price; Quads: (Argentina) Marcos Patronelli; Cars: (France) Stéphane Peterhansel; Trucks: (Netherlands) Gerard de Rooy
26 December 2015–5	Ice hockey	(Finland) 2016 World Junior Ice Hockey Championships	International	Finland
29 December 2015–6	Ski jumping	(Germany) / (Austria) 2015–16 Four Hills Tournament	International	(Slovenia) Peter Prevc
7–14	Squash	(United States) Tournament of Champions 2016 (PSA WS #4) (United States) Women's Tournament of Champions 2016	International	Men: (Egypt) Mohamed El Shorbagy; Women: (Egypt) Nour El Sherbini
8–15	Ice hockey	(Canada) 2016 IIHF World Women's U18 Championship	International	United States
8–24	Bowls	(England) 2016 World Indoor Bowls Championship	International	Men: (England) Nick Brett; Women: (England) Ellen Falkner; Pairs: (Scotland) Stewart Anderson / Darren Burnett
9–10	Speed skating	(Belarus) 2016 European Speed Skating Championships	Continental	Men: (Netherlands) Sven Kramer; Women: (Czech Republic) Martina Sáblíková
10–16	Ice hockey	(Hungary) 2016 IIHF World Women's U18 Championship – Division I	International	Japan was promoted to the Top Division; Denmark was relegated to Division I Qualification
10–17	Snooker	(England) 2016 Masters	International	(England) Ronnie O'Sullivan
10–22	Water polo	(Serbia) 2016 Women's European Water Polo Championship	Continental	Hungary
10–23	Water polo	(Serbia) 2016 Men's European Water Polo Championship	Continental	Serbia
11	American football	(United States) 2016 College Football Playoff National Championship	Domestic	Alabama Crimson Tide
12–30	Association football	(Qatar) 2016 AFC U-23 Championship	Continental	Japan
13–23	Association football	(Cook Islands) 2016 OFC U-17 Women's Championship	Continental	New Zealand
14–17	Ski flying	(Austria) FIS Ski Flying World Championships 2016	International	Individual: (Slovenia) Peter Prevc; Team: Norway
15–24	Ice hockey	(Mexico) 2016 World Junior Ice Hockey Championships – Division III	International	Mexico was promoted to Division II – Group B
15–28	Handball	(Bahrain) 2016 Asian Men's Handball Championship	Continental	Qatar
15–31	Handball	(Poland) 2016 European Men's Handball Championship	Continental	Germany
16	Rowing	(Hungary) 2016 European Rowing Indoor Championships	Continental	Poland
16–7 February	Association football	(Rwanda) 2016 African Nations Championship	Continental	DR Congo
17–23	Ice hockey	(Serbia) 2016 World Junior Ice Hockey Championships Division II – Group B	International	Romania was promoted to Division II – Group A China was relegated to Division III
17–23	Association football	(Russia) 2016 CIS Cup	International	Russia
18–31	Tennis	(Australia) 2016 Australian Open (Grand Slam #1)	International	Men: (Serbia) Novak Djokovic; Women: (Germany) Angelique Kerber
21–30	Handball	(Egypt) 2016 African Men's Handball Championship	Continental	Egypt
22–24	Speed skating	(Russia) 2016 European Short Track Speed Skating Championships	Continental	Men: (Russia) Semen Elistratov; Women: (United Kingdom) Elise Christie
22–20 November	Rallying	(European Union) / (Mexico) / (Argentina) / (Australia) 2016 World Rally Championship season	International	WRC #1: (France) Sébastien Ogier / Julien Ingrassia; WRC #2: (Finland) Esapekka Lappi / Janne Ferm; WRC #3: (Italy) Simone Tempestini / Giovanni Bernacchini
25–31	Figure skating	(Slovakia) 2016 European Figure Skating Championships	Continental	Men: (Spain) Javier Fernández; Ladies: (Russia) Evgenia Medvedeva; Pairs: (Russia) Tatiana Volosozhar / Maxim Trankov; Ice Dance: (France) Gabriella Papadakis / Guillaume Cizeron
26–30	Track cycling	(Japan) 2016 Asian Cycling Championships	Continental	South Korea
26–2 February	Biathlon	(Romania) 2016 IBU Youth/Junior World Championships	International	Norway
26–23 April	Association football	2016 OFC Champions League	Continental	(New Zealand) Auckland City FC
27–26 November	Association football	2016 AFC Champions League	Continental	(South Korea) Jeonbuk Hyundai Motors
29–31	Luge	(Germany) 2016 FIL World Luge Championships	International	Men's Singles: (Germany) Felix Loch; Men's Sprint: (Germany) Felix Loch; Women's Singles: (Germany) Natalie Geisenberger; Women's Sprint: (Switzerland) Martina Kocher; Doubles: (Germany) Tobias Wendl / Tobias Arlt; Doubles Sprint: (Germany) Tobias Wendl / Tobias Arlt
29–31	Speed skating	(Bulgaria) 2016 World Junior Short Track Speed Skating Championships	International	Men: Ren Ziwei; Women: Qu Chunyu; Medal tallies: China
30–31	Cyclo-cross	(Belgium) 2016 UCI Cyclo-cross World Championships	International	Men: (Belgium) Wout Van Aert ( (Belgium) Vastgoedservice-Golden Palace); Women: (Netherlands) Thalita de Jong ( (Netherlands) Rabo–Liv Women Cycling Team)
30–31	Darts	(England) 2016 Masters	International	(Netherlands) Michael van Gerwen
30–31	Rugby sevens	(New Zealand) 2016 Wellington Sevens (WRSS #3)	International	New Zealand
31	American football	(United States) 2016 Pro Bowl	Domestic	Team Irvin; Offensive MVP: (Virginia) Russell Wilson ( (Washington (state)) Seattle Seahawks); Defensive MVP: (Louisiana) Michael Bennett ( (Washington (state)) Seattle Seahawks)
31	Ice hockey	(United States) 2016 NHL All-Star Game	Domestic	Team Pacific; MVP: (Alberta) John Scott ( (Newfoundland and Labrador) St. John's IceCaps)
