= November 2016 in sports =

<<	November 2016					>>
Su	Mo	Tu	We	Th	Fr	Sa
		1	2	3	4	5
6	7	8	9	10	11	12
13	14	15	16	17	18	19
20	21	22	23	24	25	26
27	28	29	30
Sports

This list shows notable sports-related events and notable outcomes that occurred in November of 2016.

== Events calendar ==
Date	Sport	Venue/Event	Status	Winner/s
1	Horse racing	(Australia) 2016 Melbourne Cup	International	(Germany) Almandin (Jockey: (Australia) Kerrin McEvoy)
1–5	Beach soccer	(United Arab Emirates) 2016 Beach Soccer Intercontinental Cup	International	Brazil
4–5	Horse racing	(United States) 2016 Breeders' Cup	International	Classic: (United States) Arrogate (Jockey: (United States) Mike E. Smith); See main article for other winners.
4–6	1:10 R/C off-road racing	2016 JMRCA All-Japan 1:10 Electric Off-Road Championship	Domestic	2WD: (Japan) Yusuke Suguira ( (Japan) Kyosho); 4WD: (Japan) Naoto Matsukura ( (Japan) Kyosho)
4–9	Rhythmic Gymnastics	(Mexico) 2016 Pan American Rhythmic Gymnastics Championships	Continental	Sênior: Mexico (5 golds) Brazil (4 golds); Junior: Brazil (5 golds) Mexico (4 golds)
5	Association football	(Qatar) 2016 AFC Cup Final	Continental	(Iraq) Al-Quwa Al-Jawiya
6	Marathon	(United States) 2016 New York City Marathon (WMM #6)	International	Men: (Eritrea) Ghirmay Ghebreslassie; Women: (Kenya) Mary Jepkosgei Keitany
6–Jan/Feb 2017	Sailing	(France) 2016-17 Vendée Globe	International	(France) Armel Le Cléac'h
7–12	Snooker	(England) 2016 Champion of Champions	International	(Scotland) John Higgins
8–13	Badminton	(Spain) 2016 BWF World Junior Championships	International	China
8–16	Weightlifting	(Japan) 2016 Asian Youth and Junior Weightlifting Championships	Continental	Iran
11–30	Chess	(United States) World Chess Championship 2016	International	(Norway) Magnus Carlsen
12	Formula E	(Morocco) 2016 Marrakesh ePrix	International	(Switzerland) Sébastien Buemi ( (France) DAMS)
12–13	Tennis	(France) 2016 Fed Cup Final	International	Czech Republic
13	MMA	(United States) UFC 205: Alvarez vs. McGregor	International	(Republic of Ireland) Ireland
13	Formula One	(Brazil) 2016 Brazilian Grand Prix	International	(United Kingdom) Lewis Hamilton ( (Germany) Mercedes)
13	Motorcycle racing	(Spain) 2016 Valencian Community motorcycle Grand Prix	International	MotoGP: (Spain) Jorge Lorenzo ( (Japan) Movistar Yamaha MotoGP); Moto2: (France) Johann Zarco ( (Finland) Ajo Motorsport); Moto3: (South Africa) Brad Binder ( (Finland) Red Bull KTM Ajo)
13–17	Weightlifting	(Mexico) 2016 FISU World University Weightlifting Championships	International	China
13–20	Basketball	(Thailand) 2016 FIBA Asia Under-18 Championship for Women	Continental	China
13–20	Tennis	(United Kingdom) 2016 ATP World Tour Finals	International	Singles: (United Kingdom) Andy Murray; Doubles: (Finland) Henri Kontinen / (Australia) John Peers
13–3 December	Association football	(Papua New Guinea) 2016 FIFA U-20 Women's World Cup	International	North Korea
14–24	Amateur boxing	(Bulgaria) 2016 Women's European Amateur Boxing Championships	Continental	Russia
17–26	Amateur boxing	(Russia) 2016 AIBA Youth World Boxing Championships	International	Cuba
18–26	Curling	(Scotland) 2016 European Curling Championships	Continental	Men: Sweden (Skip: Niklas Edin); Women: Russia (Skip: Victoria Moiseeva)
18–29	Snooker	(Qatar) 2016 World Amateur Snooker Championship (Men / Women)	International	Men: (Iran) Soheil Vahedi; Women: (Belgium) Wendy Jans
19	Motorcycle racing	2016 Macau Motorcycle Grand Prix	International	(United Kingdom) Peter Hickman ( (United Kingdom) Bathams/SMT Racing)
19–20	Triathlon	(Australia) 2016 ITU Cross Triathlon World Championships	International	Men: (Spain) Rubén Ruzafa; Women: (Bermuda) Flora Duffy
19–20	Desert racing	(Mexico) 2016 Baja 1000	International	Car: (United States) Rob MacCachren/ (United States) Jason Voss; Bikes: (United States) Justin Jones/ (United States) David Kamo/ (United States) Mark Samuels/ (Australia) Daymon Stokie/ (United States) Colton Udall/
19–3 December	Association football	(Cameroon) 2016 Africa Women Cup of Nations	Continental	Nigeria
19–17 December	Association football	(Myanmar) / (Philippines) 2016 AFF Championship	Regional	Thailand
20	Touring car racing	2016 Guia Race of Macau	International	(Portugal) Tiago Monteiro ( (Sweden) WestCoast Racing)
20	GT racing	(Macau) 2016 FIA GT World Cup	International	(Belgium) Laurens Vanthoor ( (Belgium) Audi Sport Team WRT)
20	Formula Three	2016 Macau Grand Prix	International	(Portugal) António Félix da Costa ( (United Kingdom) Carlin)
22–4 December	Snooker	(England) 2016 UK Championship	International	(England) Mark Selby
24–27	Golf	(Australia) 2016 World Cup of Golf	International	Denmark (Søren Kjeldsen & Thorbjørn Olesen)
24–27	Aerobic Gymnastics	(Peru) 2016 Pan American Aerobic Gymnastics Championships	Continental	Brazil and Argentina (3 golds)
24–3 December	Multi-sport	(Chile) 2016 Bolivarian Beach Games	Regional	Chile
24–4 December	Field hockey	(Chile) 2016 Women's Hockey Junior World Cup	International	Argentina
25–27	Darts	(England) 2016 Players Championship Finals	International	(Netherlands) Michael van Gerwen
25–27	Tennis	(Croatia) 2016 Davis Cup Final	International	Argentina
27	Canadian football	(Canada) 104th Grey Cup	Domestic	(Ontario) Ottawa Redblacks
27	Formula One	(United Arab Emirates) 2016 Abu Dhabi Grand Prix	International	(United Kingdom) Lewis Hamilton ( (Germany) Mercedes)
27	Horse racing	2016 Japan Cup	International	(Japan) Kitasan Black (Jockey: (Japan) Yutaka Take)
27	Ultramarathon	(Spain) 2016 IAU 100 km World Championships	International	Men: (Japan) Hideaki Yamauchi; Women: (Australia) Kirstin Bull
27–3 December	Squash	(France) 2016 Women's World Team Squash Championships	International	Egypt
29–11 December	Bowls	(New Zealand) 2016 World Outdoor Bowls Championship	International	Australia
30–7 December	Table tennis	(South Africa) 2016 World Junior Table Tennis Championships	International	Japan
