= June 2017 in sports =

<<	May 2017					>>
Su	Mo	Tu	We	Th	Fr	Sa
	1	2	3	4	5	6
7	8	9	10	11	12	13
14	15	16	17	18	19	20
21	22	23	24	25	26	27
28	29	30	31
Sports

This list shows notable sports-related events and notable outcomes that occurred in June of 2017.

== Events calendar ==
Date	Sport	Venue/Event	Status	Winner/s
1	Association football	(Wales) 2017 UEFA Women's Champions League Final	Continental	(France) Lyon
1–4	Canoe slalom	(Slovenia) 2017 European Canoe Slalom Championships	Continental	France
1–4	Darts	(Germany) 2017 PDC World Cup of Darts	International	Netherlands (Michael van Gerwen & Raymond van Barneveld)
1–18	Cricket	(England) / (Wales) 2017 ICC Champions Trophy	International	Pakistan
2–8 July	Volleyball	(Brazil) / (Australia) / (Mexico) 2017 FIVB Volleyball World League	International	Group 1: France; Group 2: Slovenia; Group 3: Estonia
3	Association football	(Wales) 2017 UEFA Champions League Final	Continental	(Spain) Real Madrid
3	Horse racing	(England) 2017 Epsom Derby	International	Horse: (France) Wings of Eagles; Jockey: (Republic of Ireland) Padraig Beggy; Trainer: (Republic of Ireland) Aidan O'Brien
4	Triathlon	(Italy) 2017 ITU Triathlon World Cup #6	International	Men: (Switzerland) Adrien Briffod; Women: (Switzerland) Jolanda Annen
4	Motorcycle racing	(Italy) 2017 Italian motorcycle Grand Prix	International	MotoGP: (Italy) Andrea Dovizioso ( (Italy) Ducati team); Moto2: (Italy) Mattia Pasini ( (Italy) Italtrans Racing Team); Moto3: (Italy) Andrea Migno ( (Italy) Sky Racing Team VR46)
4–11	Association football	(Northern Cyprus) 2017 ConIFA European Football Cup	International	Padania
6–10	Squash	(United Arab Emirates) 2017 Men's PSA World Series Finals (United Arab Emirates) 2017 Women's PSA World Series Finals	International	Men: (Egypt) Mohamed El Shorbagy; Women: (England) Laura Massaro
6–11	Water polo	(China) 2017 FINA Women's Water Polo World League Super Final	International	United States
7–11	Basketball	(Argentina) 2017 FIBA Americas Under-16 Championship for Women	Continental	United States
8	Athletics	(Italy) Golden Gala (Diamond League #4)	International	Kenya
8–11	Rallying	(Italy) 2017 Rally d'Italia (WRC #7)	International	(Estonia) Ott Tänak & Martin Järveoja ( (United Kingdom) M-Sport)
8–12	Fencing	(Egypt) 2017 African Fencing Championships	Continental	Egypt
9–2 July	Volleyball	(Europe) 2017 Men's European Volleyball League	Continental	Ukraine
9–9 July	Volleyball	(Europe) 2017 Women's European Volleyball League	Continental	Ukraine
10	Athletics	(Belarus) 2017 European Cup 10,000m	Continental	Men: (Spain) Antonio Abadía; Women: (Portugal) Sara Moreira
10	Horse racing	(United States) 2017 Belmont Stakes	Domestic	Horse: (United States) Tapwrit; Jockey: (Puerto Rico) José Ortiz; Trainer: (United States) Todd Pletcher
10–11	Triathlon	(United Kingdom) 2017 ITU World Triathlon Series #4	International	Men: (United Kingdom) Alistair Brownlee; Women: (Bermuda) Flora Duffy
10–11	Formula E	(Germany) 2017 Berlin ePrix	International	Race 1: (Sweden) Felix Rosenqvist ( (India) Mahindra Racing Formula E Team); Race 2: (Switzerland) Sébastien Buemi ( (France) Renault e.Dams)
11	Formula One	(Canada) 2017 Canadian Grand Prix	International	(United Kingdom) Lewis Hamilton ( (Germany) Mercedes)
11	Motorcycle racing	(Catalonia) 2017 Catalan motorcycle Grand Prix	International	MotoGP: (Italy) Andrea Dovizioso ( (Italy) Ducati Team); Moto2: (Spain) Álex Márquez ( (Belgium) EG 0,0 Marc VDS); Moto3: (Spain) Joan Mir ( (Germany) Leopard Racing)
12–17	Fencing	(Georgia (country)) 2017 European Fencing Championships	Continental	Italy
12–18	Handball	(Bulgaria) 2017 IHF Emerging Nations Championship	International	Faroe Islands
12–18	Diving	(Ukraine) 2017 European Diving Championships	Continental	Russia
13–18	Fencing	(Canada) 2017 Pan American Fencing Championships	Continental	United States
13–18	Nine-ball pool	(England) 2017 World Cup of Pool	International	Austria
14–18	Basketball	(Argentina) 2017 FIBA Under-16 Americas Championship	Continental	United States
15	Athletics	(Norway) Bislett Games (Diamond League #5)	International	Great Britain
15–18	Golf	(United States) 2017 U.S. Open	International	(United States) Brooks Koepka
15–20	Fencing	(Hong Kong) 2017 Asian Fencing Championships	Continental	South Korea
16–18	Triathlon	(Austria) 2017 European Triathlon Championships	Continental	Men: (Portugal) João José Pereira; Women: (United Kingdom) Jessica Learmonth
16–23	Weightlifting	(Japan) 2017 Junior World Weightlifting Championships	International	Men: Iran; Women: China
16–24	Boxing	(Ukraine) 2017 European Amateur Boxing Championships	Continental	Ukraine
16–25	Basketball	(Czech Republic) EuroBasket Women 2017	Continental	Spain
16–27	Chess	(Russia) 2017 World Team Chess Championship	International	Men: China; Women: Russia
16–30	Association football	(Poland) 2017 UEFA European Under-21 Championship	Continental	Germany
17–18	Endurance racing	(France) 2017 24 Hours of Le Mans	International	(Germany) Timo Bernhard / (New Zealand) Brendon Hartley / (New Zealand) Earl Bamber ( (Germany) Porsche LMP Team)
17–21	Basketball	(France) 2017 FIBA 3x3 World Cup	International	Men: Serbia; Women: Russia
17–27	Sailing	(Bermuda) 2017 America's Cup	International	Emirates Team New Zealand
17–2 July	Association football	(Russia) 2017 FIFA Confederations Cup	International	Germany
18	Athletics	(Sweden) Stockholm Bauhaus Athletics (Diamond League #6)	International	Canada, Ivory Coast, Independent Athletes, and South Africa (all tied with 1 gold & 1 silver medal each)
18–25	Handball	(Canada) 2017 Pan American Women's Handball Championship	Continental	Brazil
20–25	Beach handball	(Croatia) 2017 European Beach Handball Championship	Continental	Men: Spain; Women: Norway
20–25	Water polo	(Russia) 2017 FINA Men's Water Polo World League Super Final	International	Serbia
22	Basketball	(United States) 2017 NBA draft	International	#1 pick: (Maryland) Markelle Fultz (to the (Pennsylvania) Philadelphia 76ers from the (Washington (state)) Washington Huskies)
22–25	Athletics	(United States) 2017 USA Outdoor Track and Field Championships	Domestic	For results, click here.
22–25	Association football	(Martinique) 2017 Caribbean Cup	Regional	Curaçao
23–24	Ice hockey	(United States) 2017 NHL entry draft	Domestic	#1 pick: (Switzerland) Nico Hischier (to the New Jersey Devils from the (Nova Scotia) Halifax Mooseheads)
23–25	Athletics	(Paraguay) 2017 South American Championships in Athletics	Continental	Brazil
23–25	Athletics	(France) / (Finland) / (Israel) / (Malta) 2017 European Team Championships	Continental	Super League: Germany; First League: Sweden; Second League: Hungary; Third League: Luxembourg
23–2 July	Volleyball	(Czech Republic) 2017 FIVB Volleyball Men's U21 World Championship	International	Poland
24–25	Mountain bike racing	(Germany) 2017 UCI Mountain Bike Marathon World Championships	International	Men: (Austria) Alban Lakata; Women: (Denmark) Annika Langvad
24–25	Rugby sevens	2017 France Women's Sevens (WRWSS #6)	International	New Zealand
24–25	1:8 R/C nitro off-road	(United States) 2017 ROAR 1:8 Fuel Off-Road National Championship	Domestic	(United States) Jared Tebo
24–30	Multi-sport	(Gotland) ( (Sweden) ) 2017 Island Games	International	Isle of Man
24–30	Taekwondo	(South Korea) 2017 World Taekwondo Championships	International	South Korea
24–5 August	Rugby union	(Kenya) / (Namibia) / (Senegal) / (Tunisia) / (Uganda) / (Zimbabwe) 2017 Rugby Africa Gold Cup	Continental	Namibia
25	Hillclimbing	(United States) 2017 Pikes Peak International Hill Climb	International	(France) Romain Dumas
25	Formula One	2017 Azerbaijan Grand Prix	International	(Australia) Daniel Ricciardo ( (Austria) Red Bull Racing)
25	Motorcycle racing	(Netherlands) 2017 Dutch TT	International	MotoGP: (Italy) Valentino Rossi ( (Japan) Movistar Yamaha MotoGP); Moto2: (Italy) Franco Morbidelli ( (Belgium) EG 0,0 Marc VDS); Moto3: (Spain) Arón Canet ( (Spain) Estrella Galicia 0,0)
25–9 July	Association football	(South Africa) 2017 COSAFA Cup	Regional	Zimbabwe
26–23 July	Cricket	(England) 2017 Women's Cricket World Cup	International	England
28–2 July	Swimming	(Israel) 2017 European Junior Swimming Championships	Continental	Russia
28–2 July	Basketball	(China) 2017 FIBA 3x3 U18 World Cup	International	Men: Belgium; Women: United States
29–2 July	Canoe marathon	(Portugal) 2017 Canoe Marathon European Championships	Continental	Hungary
29–2 July	Golf	(United States) U.S. Senior Open	International	(United States) Kenny Perry
29–2 July	Golf	(United States) 2017 KPMG Women's PGA Championship	International	(United States) Danielle Kang
29–2 July	Rallying	2017 Rally Poland (WRC #8)	International	(Belgium) Thierry Neuville & Nicolas Gilsoul ( (South Korea) Hyundai)
30–7 July	Orienteering	(Estonia) 2017 World Orienteering Championships	International	Sweden
30–9 July	Road bicycle racing	(Italy) 2017 Giro d'Italia Femminile	International	(Netherlands) Anna van der Breggen ( (Netherlands) Boels-Dolmans)
