= March 2017 in sports =

| << | March 2017 | | | | | >> |
| Su | Mo | Tu | We | Th | Fr | Sa |
| | | | 1 | 2 | 3 | 4 |
| 5 | 6 | 7 | 8 | 9 | 10 | 11 |
| 12 | 13 | 14 | 15 | 16 | 17 | 18 |
| 19 | 20 | 21 | 22 | 23 | 24 | 25 |
| 26 | 27 | 28 | 29 | 30 | 31 |
Sports

This list shows notable sports-related events and notable outcomes that occurred in March of 2017.

== Events calendar ==
| Date | Sport | Venue/Event | Status | Winner/s |
|---|---|---|---|---|
| 2–5 | Golf | 2017 WGC-Mexico Championship | International | (United States) Dustin Johnson |
| 3–4 | Triathlon | (United Arab Emirates) 2017 ITU World Triathlon Series #1 | International | Men: (Spain) Javier Gómez; Women: (New Zealand) Andrea Hewitt |
| 3–5 | Athletics | (Serbia) 2017 European Athletics Indoor Championships | Continental | Poland |
| 3–5 | Rugby sevens | (United States) 2017 USA Sevens (WRSS #5) (United States) 2017 USA Women's Sevens (WRWSS #3) | International | Men: South Africa; Women: New Zealand |
| 4–5 | Speed skating | (Norway) 2017 World Allround Speed Skating Championships | International | Men: (Netherlands) Sven Kramer; Women: (Netherlands) Ireen Wüst |
| 4–11 | Beach soccer | (Malaysia) 2017 AFC Beach Soccer Championship | Continental | Iran |
| 4–11 | Curling | (South Korea) 2017 World Wheelchair Curling Championship | International | Norway (Skip: Rune Lorentsen) |
| 4–26 November | Motorsport | (Australia) / (New Zealand) 2017 Supercars Championship | Regional | (Australia) Jamie Whincup ( (Australia) Triple Eight Race Engineering) |
| 6–12 | Shooting | (Slovenia) 2017 10m European Shooting Championships | Continental | Russia |
| 6–12 | Ski orienteering | (Russia) 2017 World Ski Orienteering Championships | International | Sweden |
| 6–12 | Snooker | (Wales) 2017 Players Championship | International | (England) Judd Trump |
| 6–19 | Tennis | (United States) 2017 Indian Wells Masters | International | Men: (Switzerland) Roger Federer; Women: (Russia) Elena Vesnina |
| 6–22 | Baseball | (United States) / (Japan) / (South Korea) / (Mexico) 2017 World Baseball Classic | International | United States |
| 7–12 | Fencing | (Ivory Coast) 2017 African Junior Fencing Championships | Continental | Tunisia |
| 7–19 | Freestyle skiing & Snowboarding | (Spain) FIS Freestyle Ski and Snowboarding World Championships 2017 | International | United States |
| 9–12 | Rallying | 2017 Rally Mexico (WRC #3) | International | (United Kingdom) Kris Meeke & (Republic of Ireland) Paul Nagle ( (France) Citroën) |
| 9–25 November | Rallying | (Mexico) / (Canada) / (Costa Rica) / (Venezuela) 2017 NACAM Rally Championship | Continental | (Mexico) Ricardo Triviño |
| 10–12 | Short track speed skating | (Netherlands) 2017 World Short Track Speed Skating Championships | International | Men: (South Korea) Seo Yi-ra; Women: (United Kingdom) Elise Christie |
| 10–19 | Ski jumping | (Norway) Raw Air 2017 | International | (Austria) Stefan Kraft |
| 11 | Triathlon | (Australia) 2017 ITU Triathlon World Cup #2 | International | Men: (Australia) Luke Willian; Women: (Australia) Emma Jackson |
| 11–12 | Rugby sevens | 2017 Canada Sevens (WRSS #6) | International | England |
| 12–17 September | Indy Car racing | (United States) / (Canada) 2017 IndyCar Series | International | (United States) Josef Newgarden ( (United States) Team Penske) |
| 13–19 | Ice hockey | (Serbia) 2017 IIHF World U18 Championships Division II – Group B | International | Australia was promoted to Division II – Group A Belgium was relegated to Division III – Group A |
| 13–22 | Handball | (South Korea) 2017 Asian Women's Handball Championship | Continental | South Korea |
| 14–3 April | Basketball | (United States) 2017 NCAA Division I men's basketball tournament | Domestic | North Carolina Tar Heels |
| 15–19 | Figure skating | (Chinese Taipei) 2017 World Junior Figure Skating Championships | International | Men: Vincent Zhou; Ladies: (Russia) Alina Zagitova; Pairs: Australia (Ekaterina Alexandrovskaya & Harley Windsor); Ice dance: United States (Rachel Parsons & Michael Parsons) |
| 17–2 April | Basketball | (United States) 2017 NCAA Women's Division I Basketball Tournament | Domestic | South Carolina Gamecocks |
| 18 | Road bicycle racing | (Italy) 2017 Milan–San Remo ('Monument' #1) | International | (Poland) Michał Kwiatkowski ( (United Kingdom) Team Sky) |
| 18 | Sports car racing | (United States) 2017 12 Hours of Sebring (WTSCC #2) | International | (United States) Jordan Taylor, (United States) Ricky Taylor, & (United Kingdom) Alex Lynn ( (United States) Wayne Taylor Racing) |
| 18–20 | Ice hockey | (Mexico) 2017 IIHF World U18 Championships Division III – Group B | International | Mexico was promoted to Division III – Group A |
| 18–26 | Curling | (China) 2017 World Women's Curling Championship | International | Canada (Skip: Rachel Homan) |
| 20–2 April | Tennis | (United States) 2017 Miami Open | International | Men: (Switzerland) Roger Federer; Women: (United Kingdom) Johanna Konta |
| 21–27 | Ice hockey | (Chinese Taipei) 2017 IIHF World U18 Championships Division III – Group A | International | China was promoted to Division II – Group B New Zealand was relegated to Division III – Group B |
| 22–26 | Golf | (United States) 2017 WGC-Dell Technologies Match Play | International | (United States) Dustin Johnson |
| 25 | Horse racing | (United Arab Emirates) 2017 Dubai World Cup | International | (United States) Arrogate (Jockey: (United States) Mike E. Smith) |
| 26 | Athletics | (Uganda) 2017 IAAF World Cross Country Championships | International | Men: (Kenya) Geoffrey Kamworor; Women: (Kenya) Irene Cheptai |
| 26 | Formula One | (Australia) 2017 Australian Grand Prix | International | (Germany) Sebastian Vettel ( (Italy) Ferrari) |
| 26 | Motorcycle racing | 2017 Qatar motorcycle Grand Prix | International | MotoGP: (Spain) Maverick Viñales ( (Japan) Movistar Yamaha MotoGP); Moto2: (Italy) Franco Morbidelli ( (Belgium) EG 0,0 Marc VDS); Moto3: (Spain) Jorge Martín ( (Italy) Del Conca Gresini Moto3) |
| 27–2 April | Equestrianism | (United States) 2017 FEI World Cup Jumping & Dressage Finals | International | Jumping: (United States) McLain Ward with horse HH Azur; Dressage: (Germany) Isabell Werth with horse Weihegold |
| 29–2 April | Figure skating | (Finland) 2017 World Figure Skating Championships | International | Men: (Japan) Yuzuru Hanyu; Ladies: (Russia) Evgenia Medvedeva; Pairs: China (Sui Wenjing & Han Cong); Ice dance: Canada (Tessa Virtue & Scott Moir) |
| 30–2 April | Golf | (United States) 2017 ANA Inspiration | International | (South Korea) Ryu So-yeon |
| 30–8 October | Rallying | (European Union) 2017 European Rally Championship | Continental | ERC: (Poland) Kajetan Kajetanowicz ( (Poland) Lotos Rally Team); ERC-2: (Hungary) Tibor Érdi ( (Hungary) Érdi Rally Team); ERC-3: (United Kingdom) Chris Ingram ( (Germany) Opel Rallye Junior Team) |
| 31–7 April | Ice hockey | (United States) 2017 IIHF Women's World Championship | International | United States |
| 31–26 November | Rallying | (Paraguay) / (Brazil) / (Argentina) / (Bolivia) / (Uruguay) 2017 Codasur South American Rally Championship | Continental | (Paraguay) Gustavo Saba |
