= May 2017 in sports =

| << | May 2017 | | | | | >> |
| Su | Mo | Tu | We | Th | Fr | Sa |
| | 1 | 2 | 3 | 4 | 5 | 6 |
| 7 | 8 | 9 | 10 | 11 | 12 | 13 |
| 14 | 15 | 16 | 17 | 18 | 19 | 20 |
| 21 | 22 | 23 | 24 | 25 | 26 | 27 |
| 28 | 29 | 30 | 31 |
Sports

This list shows notable sports-related events and notable outcomes that occurred in May of 2017.

== Events calendar ==
| Date | Sport | Venue/Event | Status | Winner/s |
|---|---|---|---|---|
| 1–9 | Volleyball | (Iran) 2017 Asian Men's U23 Volleyball Championship | Continental | Iran |
| 2–7 | Amateur wrestling | (Serbia) 2017 European Wrestling Championships | Continental | Men's Freestyle: Russia; Women's Freestyle: Russia; Greco-Roman: Hungary |
| 2–14 | Association football | (Czech Republic) 2017 UEFA Women's Under-17 Championship | Continental | Germany |
| 3–19 | Association football | (Croatia) 2017 UEFA European Under-17 Championship | Continental | Spain |
| 4–7 | Karate | (Turkey) 2017 EKF Senior Karate Championships | Continental | Turkey |
| 5 | Athletics | Qatar Athletic Super Grand Prix (Diamond League #1) | International | United States |
| 5–14 | Tennis | (Spain) 2017 Madrid Open | International | Men: (Spain) Rafael Nadal; Women: (Romania) Simona Halep |
| 5–21 | Ice hockey | (France) / (Germany) 2017 IIHF World Championship | International | Sweden |
| 5–28 | Road bicycle racing | (Italy) 2017 Giro d'Italia | International | (Netherlands) Tom Dumoulin ( (Germany) Team Sunweb) |
| 6 | Horse racing | (United States) 2017 Kentucky Derby | Domestic | Horse: (United States) Always Dreaming; Jockey: (Puerto Rico) John R. Velazquez; Trainer: (United States) Todd Pletcher |
| 6–7 | Triathlon | (China) 2017 ITU Triathlon World Cup #4 | International | Men: (Australia) Matthew Hauser; Women: (United Kingdom) Non Stanford |
| 7 | Motorcycle racing | (Spain) 2017 Spanish motorcycle Grand Prix | International | MotoGP: (Spain) Dani Pedrosa ( (Japan) Repsol Honda); Moto2: (Spain) Álex Márquez ( (Belgium) EG 0,0 Marc VDS); Moto3: (Spain) Arón Canet ( (Spain) Estrella Galicia 0,0) |
| 9–14 | Volleyball | (Japan) 2017 FIVB Volleyball Women's Club World Championship | International | (Turkey) Vakıfbank İstanbul |
| 10–14 | Amateur wrestling | (India) 2017 Asian Wrestling Championships | Continental | Men's Freestyle: Iran; Women's Freestyle: Japan; Greco-Roman: Iran |
| 11–14 | Golf | (United States) 2017 Players Championship | International | (South Korea) Kim Si-woo |
| 12 | Rugby union | (Scotland) 2017 European Rugby Challenge Cup Final | Continental | (France) Stade Français |
| 12–14 | Rugby sevens | (France) 2017 Paris Sevens (WRSS #9) | International | South Africa |
| 12–22 | Multi-sport | (Azerbaijan) 2017 Islamic Solidarity Games | International | Azerbaijan |
| 13 | Athletics | (China) Shanghai Golden Grand Prix (Diamond League #2) | International | United States |
| 13 | Formula E | 2017 Monaco ePrix | International | (Switzerland) Sébastien Buemi ( (France) DAMS) |
| 13 | Rugby union | (Scotland) 2017 European Rugby Champions Cup Final | Continental | (England) Saracens |
| 13–14 | Triathlon | (Japan) 2017 ITU World Triathlon Series #3 | International | Men: (Spain) Mario Mola; Women: (Bermuda) Flora Duffy |
| 13–8 October | Motorsport | (European Union) 2017 European Truck Racing Championship | Continental | (Czech Republic) Adam Lacko ( (Germany) MAN SE) |
| 14 | Formula One | (Spain) 2017 Spanish Grand Prix | International | (United Kingdom) Lewis Hamilton ( (Germany) Mercedes) |
| 14–28 | Association football | (Gabon) 2017 Africa U-17 Cup of Nations | Continental | Mali |
| 15–21 | Tennis | (Italy) 2017 Italian Open | International | Men: (Germany) Alexander Zverev; Women: (Ukraine) Elina Svitolina |
| 18–21 | Golf | (United States) The Tradition | International | (Germany) Bernhard Langer |
| 18–21 | Artistic gymnastics | (Thailand) 2017 Asian Artistic Gymnastics Championships | Continental | China |
| 18–21 | Rallying | 2017 Rally de Portugal (WRC #6) | International | (France) Sébastien Ogier & Julien Ingrassia ( (United Kingdom) M-Sport) |
| 19–21 | Basketball | (Turkey) 2017 EuroLeague Final Four | Continental | (Turkey) Fenerbahçe |
| 19–21 | Rhythmic gymnastics | (Hungary) 2017 Rhythmic Gymnastics European Championships | Continental | Russia |
| 19–27 | Nine-pin bowling | (Germany) 2017 nine-pin bowling World Team Championships | International | Men: Serbia; Women: Germany |
| 20 | Formula E | (France) 2017 Paris ePrix | International | (Switzerland) Sébastien Buemi ( (France) DAMS) |
| 20 | Horse racing | (United States) 2017 Preakness Stakes | Domestic | Horse: (United States) Cloud Computing; Jockey: (Venezuela) Javier Castellano; Trainer: (United States) Chad Brown |
| 20–21 | Rowing | (Germany) 2017 European Junior Rowing Championships | Continental | Germany |
| 20–21 | Rugby sevens | (England) 2017 London Sevens (WRSS #10) | International | Scotland |
| 20–11 June | Association football | (South Korea) 2017 FIFA U-20 World Cup | International | England |
| 21 | Motorcycle racing | (France) 2017 French motorcycle Grand Prix | International | MotoGP: (Spain) Maverick Viñales ( (Japan) Movistar Yamaha MotoGP); Moto2: (Italy) Franco Morbidelli ( (Belgium) EG 0,0 Marc VDS); Moto3: (Spain) Joan Mir ( (Germany) Leopard Racing) |
| 21 | Athletics | (Czech Republic) 2017 European Race Walking Cup | Continental | Men's 20 km: (Germany) Christopher Linke; Women's 20 km: (Italy) Antonella Palmisano; Men's 50 km: (Ukraine) Ivan Banzeruk |
| 21–28 | Badminton | (Australia) 2017 Sudirman Cup | International | South Korea |
| 21–23 September | NASCAR | (Canada) 2017 NASCAR Pinty's Series | Domestic | (Quebec) Alex Labbé ( (United States) Go Fas Racing) |
| 23–27 | Karate | (Curaçao) 2017 Pan American Karate Championships | Continental | Brazil |
| 24 | Association football | (Sweden) 2017 UEFA Europa League Final | Continental | (England) Manchester United |
| 25–28 | Golf | (England) 2017 BMW PGA Championship | International | (Sweden) Alex Norén |
| 25–28 | Golf | (United States) Senior PGA Championship | International | (Germany) Bernhard Langer |
| 26–28 | Judo | (Hong Kong) 2017 Asian Judo Championships | Continental | Japan |
| 26–28 | Rowing | (Czech Republic) 2017 European Rowing Championships | Continental | Italy |
| 26–12 June | Sailing | (Bermuda) 2017 Louis Vuitton Cup | International | Emirates Team New Zealand |
| 26–17 September | Motorsport | (European Union) 2017 European Autocross Championship | Continental | Super Buggy: (Germany) Bernd Stubbe; Buggy 1600: (Czech Republic) Petr Nikodem; Touring Autocross: (Czech Republic) Ales Fucik; Junior Buggy: (Latvia) Justs Grencis |
| 27 | Athletics | (United States) Prefontaine Classic (Diamond League #3) | International | United States |
| 27 | Rugby union | (Republic of Ireland) 2017 Pro12 Grand Final | Continental | (Wales) Scarlets |
| 27–9 June | Motorcycle racing | 2017 Isle of Man TT | International | For results, click here. |
| 27–28 | Rugby sevens | 2017 Canada Women's Sevens (WRWSS #5) | International | New Zealand |
| 28 | Triathlon | (Spain) 2017 ITU Triathlon World Cup #5 | International | Men: (New Zealand) Ryan Sissons; Women: (United Kingdom) Georgia Taylor-Brown |
| 28 | Formula One | 2017 Monaco Grand Prix | International | (Germany) Sebastian Vettel ( (Italy) Ferrari) |
| 28 | INDYCAR | (United States) 2017 Indianapolis 500 | International | (Japan) Takuma Sato ( (United States) Andretti Autosport) |
| 28–11 June | Tennis | (France) 2017 French Open (Grand Slam #2) | International | Men: (Spain) Rafael Nadal; Women: (Latvia) Jeļena Ostapenko |
| 29–3 June | Multi-sport | (San Marino) 2017 Games of the Small States of Europe | Continental | Luxembourg |
| 29–5 June | Table tennis | (Germany) 2017 World Table Tennis Championships | International | Men: (China) Ma Long; Women: (China) Ding Ning |
| 29–10 June | Association football | (France) 2017 Toulon Tournament | International | England |
| 31–18 June | Rugby union | (Georgia (country)) 2017 World Rugby Under 20 Championship | International | New Zealand |
