= December 2016 in sports =

<<	December 2016					>>
Su	Mo	Tu	We	Th	Fr	Sa
				1	2	3
4	5	6	7	8	9	10
11	12	13	14	15	16	17
18	19	20	21	22	23	24
25	26	27	28	29	30	31
Sports

This list shows notable sports-related events and notable outcomes that occurred in December of 2016.

== Events calendar ==
Date	Sport	Venue/Event	Status	winner/s
2–3	Rugby sevens	(United Arab Emirates) 2016 Dubai Sevens (WRSS #1) (United Arab Emirates) 2016 Dubai Women's Sevens (WRWSS #1)	International	Men: South Africa; Women: New Zealand
2–9	Ten-pin bowling	(Qatar) 2016 World Bowling Singles Championships	International	Men: (Denmark) Jesper Agerbo; Women: (United States) Kelly Kulick
2–11	Tennis	(Japan) / (Singapore) / (India) 2016 International Premier Tennis League	International	Singapore Slammers
3–11	Floorball	(Latvia) 2016 Men's World Floorball Championships	International	Finland
4–18	Handball	(Sweden) 2016 European Women's Handball Championship	Continental	Norway
5–10	Basketball	(Fiji) 2016 FIBA Oceania Under-18 Championship (Fiji) 2016 FIBA Oceania Under-18 Championship for Women	Continental	Men: New Zealand; Women: Australia
6–9	Pool	(England) 2016 Mosconi Cup	International	Europe
6–11	Swimming	(Canada) 2016 FINA World Swimming Championships (25 m)	International	United States
8–11	Table tennis	(Qatar) 2016 ITTF World Tour Grand Finals	International	Men: (China) Ma Long; Women: (China) Zhu Yuling
8–18	Association football	(Japan) 2016 FIFA Club World Cup	International	(Spain) Real Madrid
8–18	Field hockey	(India) 2016 Men's Hockey Junior World Cup	International	India
10–11	Amateur wrestling	(Hungary) 2016 World Wrestling Championships	International	Russia
10–11	Rugby sevens	2016 South Africa Sevens (WRSS #2)	International	England
11	Athletics	(Italy) 2016 European Cross Country Championships	Continental	Men: (Turkey) Aras Kaya; Women: (Turkey) Yasemin Can
11	Horse racing	2016 Hong Kong Cup	International	(Japan) Maurice (Jockey: (United Kingdom) Ryan Moore)
11–17	Ice hockey	(Germany) 2017 World Junior Ice Hockey Championships Division I – Group A	International	Belarus was promoted to the Top Division; Norway was relegated to Division I – Group B
11–17	Ice hockey	(Hungary) 2017 World Junior Ice Hockey Championships Division I – Group B	International	Hungary was promoted to Division I – Group A Great Britain was relegated to Division II – Group A
11–17	Ice hockey	(Estonia) 2017 World Junior Ice Hockey Championships Division II – Group A	International	Lithuania was promoted to Division I – Group B Croatia was relegated to Division II – Group B
12–13	Taekwondo	(Azerbaijan) 2016 World Cup Taekwondo Team Championships	International	Men: Azerbaijan; Women: China; Mixed: South Korea
12–17	Ice hockey	(Chinese Taipei) 2017 Women's Ice Hockey World Championships Division II – Group B Qualification	International	Chinese Taipei was promoted to Division II – Group B
12–18	Water polo	(New Zealand) 2016 FINA World Women's Youth Water Polo Championships	International	Russia
13–18	Beach soccer	(Nigeria) 2016 Africa Beach Soccer Cup of Nations	Continental	Senegal
14–18	Badminton	(United Arab Emirates) 2016 BWF Super Series Masters Finals	International	Men: (Denmark) Viktor Axelsen; Women: (Chinese Taipei) Tai Tzu-ying
14–20	Sailing	(New Zealand) 2016 Youth Sailing World Championships	International	Medal Table: Australia; Nations Trophy: Italy
15–2 January 2017	Darts	(England) 2017 PDC World Darts Championship	International	(Netherlands) Michael van Gerwen
16–22	Basketball	(Turkey) 2016 FIBA Europe Under-18 Championship	Continental	France
26–5 January 2017	Ice hockey	(Canada) 2017 World Junior Ice Hockey Championships	International	United States
28	Biathlon	(Germany) 2016 World Team Challenge	International	Germany (Simon Schempp & Vanessa Hinz)
29–6 January 2017	Ski jumping	(Germany) / (Austria) 2016–17 Four Hills Tournament	International	(Poland) Kamil Stoch
