= February 2017 in sports =

<<	February 2017					>>
Su	Mo	Tu	We	Th	Fr	Sa
			1	2	3	4
5	6	7	8	9	10	11
12	13	14	15	16	17	18
19	20	21	22	23	24	25
26	27	28
Sports

This list shows notable sports-related events and notable outcomes that occurred in February of 2017.

== Events calendar ==
Date	Sport	Venue/Event	Status	Winner/s
1–5	Biathlon	(Czech Republic) 2017 IBU Junior Open European Championships	Continental	Czech Republic
2–5	Luge	(Romania) 2017 FIL World Luge Natural Track Championships	International	Italy
2–5	Table tennis	(Russia) 2017 European Under-21 Table Tennis Championships	Continental	Men: (Croatia) Tomislav Pucar; Women: (Germany) Chantal Mantz
3–4	Rugby sevens	(Australia) 2017 Sydney Women's Sevens (WRWSS #2)	International	Canada
3–15 September	Rallying	(Qatar) / (Jordan) / (Cyprus) / (Lebanon) / (Iran) 2017 Middle East Rally Championship	Regional	MERC-1: (Qatar) Nasser Al-Attiyah; MERC-2: (Kuwait) Mshari Al-Thefiri; MERC-3: (Jordan) Asem Aref
4–5	Luge	(Latvia) 2017 FIL Junior World Luge Championships	International	Germany
4–5	Rugby sevens	(Australia) 2017 Sydney Sevens (WRSS #4)	International	South Africa
4–4 March	Rugby union	(Argentina) / (Brazil) / (Canada) / (Chile) / (United States) / (Uruguay) 2017 Americas Rugby Championship	Continental	United States
4–18 March	Rugby union	(England) / (France) / (Republic of Ireland) / (Italy) / (Scotland) / (Wales) 2017 Six Nations Championship	Continental	England
5	American football	(United States) Super Bowl LI	Domestic	(Massachusetts) New England Patriots; MVP: (California) Tom Brady (New England Patriots)
5–12	Beach soccer	(Paraguay) 2017 CONMEBOL Beach Soccer Championship	Continental	Brazil
6–10	Track cycling	(India) 2017 Asian Track Cycling Championships	Continental	Hong Kong
6–12	Snooker	(England) 2017 World Grand Prix	International	(England) Barry Hawkins
6–19	Alpine skiing	(Switzerland) FIS Alpine World Ski Championships 2017	International	Austria
8–19	Biathlon	(Austria) Biathlon World Championships 2017	International	Germany
9–12	Speed skating	(South Korea) 2017 World Single Distance Speed Skating Championships	International	Netherlands
9–12	Rallying	2017 Rally Sweden (WRC #2)	International	(Finland) Jari-Matti Latvala & Miikka Anttila ( (Japan) Toyota)
10–5 March	Chess	(Iran) Women's World Chess Championship 2017	International	(China) Tan Zhongyi
10–22 October	Rallying	(Ivory Coast) / (Kenya) / (South Africa) / (Uganda) / (Tanzania) / (Rwanda) | (Zambia) 2017 African Rally Championship	Continental	(Kenya) Manvir Baryan
11	Triathlon	(South Africa) 2017 ITU Triathlon World Cup #1	International	Men: (South Africa) Richard Murray; Women: (United Kingdom) Lucy Hall
11–24	Association football	(French Polynesia) 2017 OFC U-17 Championship	Continental	New Zealand
11–19 March	Rugby union	(Belgium) / (Georgia (country)) / (Germany) / (Romania) / (Russia) / (Spain) 2017 Rugby Europe Championship	Continental	Romania
12–17	Multi-sport	(Turkey) 2017 European Youth Olympic Winter Festival	Continental	Russia
13–26	Bobsleigh and Skeleton	(Germany) IBSF World Championships 2017	International	Germany
14–18	Volleyball	(Brazil) 2017 Women's South American Volleyball Club Championship	Continental	(Brazil) Rexona-Sesc
15–19	Figure skating	(South Korea) 2017 Four Continents Figure Skating Championships	International	Men: (United States) Nathan Chen; Ladies: (Japan) Mai Mihara; Pairs: China (Sui Wenjing & Han Cong); Ice dance: Canada (Tessa Virtue & Scott Moir)
16–26	Curling	(South Korea) 2017 World Junior Curling Championships	International	Men: South Korea (Skip: Lee Ki-jeong); Women: Sweden (Skip: Isabella Wranå)
17–19	Speed skating	(Finland) 2017 World Junior Speed Skating Championships	International	Netherlands
17–19	Pool	(Gibraltar) 2017 World Pool Masters	International	(Spain) David Alcaide
17–5 March	Association football	(Costa Rica) 2017 CONCACAF U-20 Championship	Continental	United States
17–18 November	Rallying	(European Union) 2017 European Rally Trophy	Continental	Alpine rally: (Italy) Paolo Andreucci & (France) Jean-Pascal Besson (tie); Balkan rally: (Turkey) Orhan Avcioglu; Baltic rally: (Lithuania) Benediktas Vanagas; Benelux rally: (Netherlands) Hermen Kobus; Celtic rally: (Republic of Ireland) Sam Moffett; Central rally: (Czech Republic) Ondrej Bisaha; Iberian rally: (Spain) Ivan Ares
18	Formula E	(Argentina) 2017 Buenos Aires ePrix	International	(Switzerland) Sébastien Buemi ( (France) DAMS)
19	Basketball	(United States) 2017 NBA All-Star Game	Domestic	Western Conference (NBA); MVP: (Illinois) Anthony Davis ( (Louisiana) New Orleans Pelicans)
19	Rugby league	(England) 2017 World Club Challenge	International	(England) Wigan Warriors
19–26	Multi-sport	(Japan) 2017 Asian Winter Games	Continental	Japan
20–26	Beach soccer	(The Bahamas) 2017 CONCACAF Beach Soccer Championship	Continental	Panama
21–25	Volleyball	(Brazil) 2017 Men's South American Volleyball Club Championship	Continental	(Brazil) Sada Cruzeiro
21–28	Biathlon	(Slovakia) 2017 IBU Youth/Junior World Championships	International	Russia
22–5 March	Nordic skiing	(Finland) FIS Nordic World Ski Championships 2017	International	Norway
23–27	Multi-sport	(Russia) 2017 Winter Military World Games	International	Russia
23–19 March	Association football	(Chile) 2017 South American Under-17 Football Championship	Continental	Brazil
23–5 August	Rugby union	(Australia) / (Argentina) / (Japan) / (New Zealand) / (South Africa) 2017 Super Rugby season	International	(New Zealand) Crusaders
24–5 March	Fencing	(Thailand) 2017 Asian Junior and Cadet Fencing Championships	Continental	Junior: South Korea; Cadet: Hong Kong
24–28 October	Rallying	(European Union) / (Russia) / (United Arab Emirates) / (Qatar) / (Kazakhstan) / (Morocco) 2017 World Cup for Cross Country Rallies	International	Main: (Qatar) Nasser Al-Attiyah; T2: (Saudi Arabia) Yasir Seaidan; T3: (France) Claude Fournier; 2WD: (United Arab Emirates) Sheik Khalid Al Qassimi
24–17 November	NASCAR	(United States) 2017 NASCAR Camping World Truck Series	Domestic	(Oklahoma) Christopher Bell ( (North Carolina) Kyle Busch Motorsports)
25–26	Speed skating	(Canada) 2017 World Sprint Speed Skating Championships	International	Men: (Netherlands) Kai Verbij; Women: (Japan) Nao Kodaira
25–18 November	NASCAR	(United States) 2017 NASCAR Xfinity Series	Domestic	(North Carolina) William Byron ( (North Carolina) JR Motorsports)
26	Athletics	(Japan) 2017 Tokyo Marathon (WMM #1)	International	Men: (Kenya) Wilson Kipsang; Women: (Kenya) Sarah Chepchirchir
26–19 November	NASCAR	(United States) 2017 Monster Energy NASCAR Cup Series	Domestic	(New Jersey) Martin Truex Jr. ( (Colorado) Furniture Row Racing)
26	NASCAR	(United States) 2017 Daytona 500	Domestic	(Nevada) Kurt Busch ( (North Carolina) Stewart–Haas Racing)
26–12 March	Association football	(Zambia) 2017 Africa U-20 Cup of Nations	Continental	Zambia
27–5 March	Fencing	(Cuba) 2017 Pan American Junior and Cadet Fencing Championships	Continental	Junior: United States; Cadet: United States
27–5 March	Ice hockey	(Iceland) 2017 IIHF Women's World Championship Division II – Group B	International	Mexico was promoted to Division II – Group A Romania was relegated to Division II – Group B Qualification
28–9 March	Fencing	(Bulgaria) 2017 European Junior and Cadet Fencing Championships	Continental	Junior: Russia; Cadet: Italy
