= October 2016 in sports =

<<	October 2016					>>
Su	Mo	Tu	We	Th	Fr	Sa
						1
2	3	4	5	6	7	8
9	10	11	12	13	14	15
16	17	18	19	20	21	22
23	24	25	26	27	28	29
30	31
Sports

This list shows notable sports-related events and notable outcomes that occurred in October of 2016.

== Events calendar ==
Date	Sport	Venue/Event	Status	Winner/s
1	Speedway	2016 FIM Torun Grand Prix of Poland	International	(Denmark) Niels Kristian Iversen
1–3	Table tennis	(Germany) 2016 Men's World Cup	International	(China) Fan Zhendong
1–8	R/C 1:8 nitro off-road racing	(United States) 2016 IFMAR 1:8 IC Off-Road World Championship	International	(Sweden) David Ronnefalk ( (Switzerland) HB Racing)
2	Formula One	(Malaysia) 2016 Malaysian Grand Prix	International	(Australia) Daniel Ricciardo ( (Austria) Red Bull Racing)
2	Horse racing	(France) 2016 Prix de l'Arc de Triomphe	International	(Republic of Ireland) Found (Jockey: (United Kingdom) Ryan Moore)
2–8	Darts	(Republic of Ireland) 2016 World Grand Prix	International	(Netherlands) Michael van Gerwen
3–8	Amateur boxing	(Thailand) 2016 World University Boxing Championships	International	Thailand
3–9	Tennis	2016 China Open	International	Men: (United Kingdom) Andy Murray; Women: (Poland) Agnieszka Radwańska
4–22	Baseball	(United States) 2016 Major League Baseball postseason	Domestic	ALCS: (Ohio) Cleveland Indians; NLCS: (Illinois) Chicago Cubs
6–9	Supercars	(Australia) 2016 Supercheap Auto Bathurst 1000	Domestic	(Australia) Will Davison / (Australia) Jonathon Webb ( (Australia) Tekno Autosports)
7–9	Table tennis	(United States) 2016 Women's World Cup	International	(Japan) Miu Hirano
7–9	Amateur wrestling	(Poland) 2016 World Veteran Wrestling Championships (Men's & Women's Freestyle only)	International	For results, click here.
7–22	Kabaddi	(India) 2016 Kabaddi World Cup	International	India
8	Multi-sport	(Switzerland) Cybathlon	International	Switzerland
8	Triathlon	(United States) 2016 Ironman World Championship	International	Men: (Germany) Jan Frodeno; Women: (Switzerland) Daniela Ryf
9	Formula E	2016 Hong Kong ePrix	International	(Switzerland) Sébastien Buemi ( (France) Renault e.dams)
9	Formula One	(Japan) 2016 Japanese Grand Prix	International	(Germany) Nico Rosberg ( (Germany) Mercedes)
9	Marathon	(United States) 2016 Chicago Marathon (WMM #5)	International	Men: (Kenya) Abel Kirui; Women: (Kenya) Florence Kiplagat
9–16	Road bicycle racing	(Qatar) 2016 UCI Road World Championships	International	Germany
9–16	Tennis	(China) 2016 Shanghai Masters	International	(United Kingdom) Andy Murray
11–15	3x3 basketball	(China) 2016 FIBA 3x3 World Championships	International	Men: Serbia; Women: Czech Republic
12–May 2017	Basketball	(Germany) / (Greece) / (Israel) / (Italy) / (Lithuania) / (Russia) / (Serbia) / (Spain) / (Turkey) 2016–17 EuroLeague	Continental	(Turkey) Fenerbahçe
13–30	Association football	(Bahrain) 2016 AFC U-19 Championship	Continental	Japan
14–22	Curling	(Russia) 2016 World Mixed Curling Championship	International	Russia (Alexander Krushelnitskiy, Anastasia Bryzgalova, Daniil Goriachev, Maria Duyunova)
15–16	Radio-controlled racing	2016 JMRCA All-Japan 1:8 GP Racing Championship	Domestic	(Japan) Takaaki Shimo ( (Japan) Mugen Seiki)
16	Motorcycle racing	(Japan) 2016 Japanese motorcycle Grand Prix	International	MotoGP: (Spain) Marc Márquez ( (Japan) Repsol Honda Team); Moto2: (Switzerland) Thomas Lüthi ( (Switzerland) Garage Plus Interwetten); Moto3: (Italy) Enea Bastianini ( (Italy) Gresini Racing Moto3)
17–23	Volleyball	(Brazil) 2016 FIVB Volleyball Men's Club World Championship	International	(Brazil) Sada Cruzeiro
18–23	Table tennis	(Hungary) 2016 European Table Tennis Championships	Continental	Germany
18–23	Volleyball	(Philippines) 2016 FIVB Volleyball Women's Club World Championship	International	(Turkey) Eczacıbaşı VitrA
19–23	Track cycling	(France) 2016 UEC European Track Championships	Continental	France
20–23	Radio-controlled racing	(United States) 2016 ROAR 1:8 Fuel On-Road National Championship	Domestic	(China) Jonathan J. Wang
21–23	Rowing	(Monaco) 2016 World Rowing Coastal Championships	International	Spain
22	Speedway	2016 FIM Grand Prix of Australia	International	(Australia) Chris Holder
22	Triathlon	(South Korea) ITU Triathlon World Cup #9	International	Men: (Spain) Uxio Abuin Ares; Women: (United States) Summer Cook
23	Formula One	2016 United States Grand Prix	International	(United Kingdom) Lewis Hamilton ( (Germany) Mercedes)
23	Ice hockey	(Canada) 2016 Heritage Classic	Domestic	(Alberta) Edmonton Oilers
23	Motorcycle racing	(Australia) 2016 Australian Motorcycle Grand Prix	International	MotoGP: (United Kingdom) Cal Crutchlow ( (Monaco) LCR Honda); Moto2: (Switzerland) Thomas Lüthi ( (Switzerland) Garage Plus Interwetten); Moto3: (South Africa) Brad Binder ( (Finland) Red Bull KTM Ajo)
23–30	Snooker	(China) 2016 International Championship	International	(England) Mark Selby
23–30	Tennis	(Singapore) 2016 WTA Finals	International	Singles: (Slovakia) Dominika Cibulková; Doubles: (Russia) Ekaterina Makarova / (Russia) Elena Vesnina
24–30	Table tennis	(Morocco) 2016 African Table Tennis Championships	Continental	Egypt
25–30	Amateur wrestling	(Turkey) 2016 World University Wrestling Championships	International	Freestyle: Iran; Greco-Roman: Turkey; Women Wrestling: Russia
25–30	Karate	(Austria) 2016 World Karate Championships	International	Japan
25–2 November	Baseball	(United States) 2016 Major League Baseball World Series	Domestic	(Illinois) Chicago Cubs
27–30	Golf	(China) 2016 WGC-HSBC Champions	International	(Japan) Hideki Matsuyama
27–6 November	Squash	(Egypt) 2016 Men's World Open Squash Championship	International	(Egypt) Karim Abdel Gawad
28–30	Darts	(Belgium) 2016 European Championship	International	(Netherlands) Michael van Gerwen
28–6 November	Baseball	(Mexico) 2016 23U Baseball World Cup	International	Japan
28–20 November	Rugby league	(England) 2016 Rugby League Four Nations	International	Australia
29	Triathlon	(Japan) ITU Triathlon World Cup #10	International	Men: (Spain) Uxio Abuin Ares; Women: (Japan) Ai Ueda
29–6 November	Tennis	(France) 2016 Paris Masters	International	Singles: (United Kingdom) Andy Murray; Doubles: (Finland) Henri Kontinen / (Australia) John Peers
30	Motorcycle racing	(Malaysia) 2016 Malaysian motorcycle Grand Prix	International	MotoGP: (Italy) Andrea Dovizioso ( (Italy) Ducati Team); Moto2: (France) Johann Zarco ( (Finland) Ajo Motorsport); Moto3: (Italy) Francesco Bagnaia ( (Spain) Aspar Mahindra Team Moto3)
30	Formula One	(Mexico) 2016 Mexican Grand Prix	International	(United Kingdom) Lewis Hamilton ( (Germany) Mercedes)
