= January 2017 in sports =

| << | January 2017 | | | | | >> |
| Su | Mo | Tu | We | Th | Fr | Sa |
| 1 | 2 | 3 | 4 | 5 | 6 | 7 |
| 8 | 9 | 10 | 11 | 12 | 13 | 14 |
| 15 | 16 | 17 | 18 | 19 | 20 | 21 |
| 22 | 23 | 24 | 25 | 26 | 27 | 28 |
| 29 | 30 | 31 |
Sports

This list shows notable sports-related events and notable outcomes that occurred in January 2017.

== Events calendar ==
| Date | Sport | Venue/Event | Status | Winner/s |
|---|---|---|---|---|
| 1 | Ice hockey | (Canada) NHL Centennial Classic | Domestic | (Ontario) Toronto Maple Leafs |
| 1–7 | Tennis | (Australia) 2017 Hopman Cup | International | France |
| 15 December 2016–2 | Darts | (England) 2017 PDC World Darts Championship | International | (Netherlands) Michael van Gerwen |
| 2 | Ice hockey | (United States) 2017 NHL Winter Classic | Domestic | (Missouri) St. Louis Blues |
| 2–14 | Rally raid | (Paraguay) / (Bolivia) / (Argentina) 2017 Dakar Rally | International | Bikes: (United Kingdom) Sam Sunderland; Quads: (Russia) Sergey Karyakin; Cars: (France) Stéphane Peterhansel; Trucks: (Russia) Eduard Nikolaev; UTV: (Brazil) Leandro Torres |
| 26 December 2016–5 | Ice hockey | (Canada) 2017 World Junior Ice Hockey Championships | International | United States |
| 5–6 | Luge | (Germany) FIL European Luge Championships 2017 | Continental | Germany |
| 29 December 2016–6 | Ski jumping | (Germany) / (Austria) 2016–17 Four Hills Tournament | International | (Poland) Kamil Stoch |
| 6–8 | Speed skating | (Netherlands) 2017 European Speed Skating Championships | Continental | Men's Allround: (Netherlands) Sven Kramer; Women's Allround: (Netherlands) Ireen Wüst; Men's Sprint: (Netherlands) Kai Verbij; Women's Sprint: (Czech Republic) Karolína Erbanová |
| 7–13 | Ice hockey | (Spain) 2017 World Junior Ice Hockey Championships Division II – Group B | International | South Korea was promoted to Division II – Group A Australia was relegated to Division III |
| 7–14 | Ice hockey | (Czech Republic) 2017 IIHF World Women's U18 Championship | International | United States |
| 7–15 | Darts | (England) 2017 BDO World Darts Championship | International | Men: (England) Glen Durrant; Women: (England) Lisa Ashton |
| 31 December 2016–8 | Cross-country skiing | (Switzerland) / (Germany) / (Italy) 2016–17 Tour de Ski | International | Men: (Russia) Sergey Ustiugov; Women: (Norway) Heidi Weng |
| 8–14 | Ice hockey | (Hungary) 2017 IIHF World Women's U18 Championship Division I – Group A | International | Germany was promoted to the Top Division; France was relegated to Division I – Group B |
| 8–14 | Ice hockey | (Poland) 2017 IIHF World Women's U18 Championship Division I – Group B | International | Italy was promoted to Division I – Group A Kazakhstan was relegated to Division I B Qualification |
| 9 | American football | (United States) 2017 College Football Playoff National Championship | Domestic | (South Carolina) Clemson Tigers |
| 11–29 | Handball | (France) 2017 World Men's Handball Championship | International | France |
| 13–15 | Field hockey | (Portugal) 2017 EuroHockey Men's Indoor Junior Nations Championship | Continental | Poland |
| 13–15 | Short track speed skating | (Italy) 2017 European Short Track Speed Skating Championships | Continental | Men: (Russia) Semion Elistratov; Women: (Italy) Arianna Fontana |
| 13–22 | Association football | (Panama) 2017 Copa Centroamericana | Regional | Honduras |
| 13–29 | Bowls | (England) 2017 World Indoor Bowls Championship | International | Open: (Scotland) Paul Foster; Women: (England) Katherine Rednall |
| 14–5 February | Association football | (Gabon) 2017 Africa Cup of Nations | Continental | Cameroon |
| 15–22 | Snooker | (England) 2017 Masters | International | (England) Ronnie O'Sullivan |
| 16–22 | Ice hockey | (New Zealand) 2017 World Junior Ice Hockey Championships – Division III | International | Turkey was promoted to Division II – Group B |
| 16–29 | Tennis | (Australia) 2017 Australian Open (Grand Slam #1) | International | Men: (Switzerland) Roger Federer; Women: (United States) Serena Williams |
| 18–11 February | Association football | (Ecuador) 2017 South American Youth Football Championship | Continental | Uruguay |
| 6 November 2016–19 | Sailing | (France) 2016–17 Vendée Globe | International | (France) Armel Le Cléac'h |
| 19–22 | Rallying | (Monaco) 2017 Monte Carlo Rally (WRC #1) | International | (France) Sébastien Ogier & Julien Ingrassia ( (United Kingdom) M-Sport) |
| 20–22 | Field hockey | (Austria) 2017 EuroHockey Women's Indoor Junior Nations Championship | Continental | Czech Republic |
| 20–22 | 1:10 R/C off-road racing | (United States) 2017 Reedy International Off-Road Race of Champions | International | Invitational: (United States) Ryan Cavalieri ( (United States) Team Associated) |
| 21–22 | Luge | (Germany) 2017 FIL Junior European Luge Championships | Continental | Germany |
| 24–28 | Skeleton | (Latvia) 2017 IBSF Junior Skeleton World Championships | International | Russia |
| 25–29 | Biathlon | (Poland) 2017 IBU Open European Championships | Continental | Russia |
| 25–29 | Figure skating | (Czech Republic) 2017 European Figure Skating Championships | Continental | Men: (Spain) Javier Fernández; Ladies: Evgenia Medvedeva; Pairs: Russia (Evgenia Tarasova & Vladimir Morozov); Ice dance: France (Gabriella Papadakis & Guillaume Cizeron) |
| 26–29 | Ice hockey | (Spain) 2017 IIHF World Women's U18 Championship Division I – Group B Qualification | International | Australia was promoted to Division I – Group B |
| 26–29 | Multi-sport | (United States) Winter X Games XXI | International | United States |
| 27–29 | Bobsleigh | (Germany) 2017 IBSF Junior Bobsleigh World Championships | International | Germany |
| 27–29 | Short track speed skating | (Austria) 2017 World Junior Short Track Speed Skating Championships | International | South Korea |
| 27–29 | Luge | (Austria) 2017 FIL World Luge Championships | International | Germany |
| 28 | Horse racing | (United States) 2017 Pegasus World Cup | International | (United States) Arrogate (Jockey: (United States) Mike E. Smith) |
| 28–29 | Cyclo-cross | (Luxembourg) 2017 UCI Cyclo-cross World Championships | International | Netherlands |
| 28–29 | Ice hockey | (United States) 62nd National Hockey League All-Star Game | Domestic | Metropolitan Division; MVP: (Ontario) Wayne Simmonds ( (Pennsylvania) Philadelphia Flyers) |
| 28–29 | Rugby sevens | (New Zealand) 2017 Wellington Sevens (WRSS #3) | International | South Africa |
| 28–29 | Sports car racing | (United States) 2017 24 Hours of Daytona (WTSCC #1) | Domestic | (United States) Ricky Taylor / (United States) Jordan Taylor / (Italy) Max Angelelli / (United States) Jeff Gordon ( (United States) Wayne Taylor Racing) |
| 28–8 February | Multi-sport | (Kazakhstan) 2017 Winter Universiade | International | Russia |
| 29 | American football | (United States) 2017 Pro Bowl | Domestic | American Football Conference (AFC); Offensive MVP: (Ohio) Travis Kelce; Defensive MVP: (California) Lorenzo Alexander |
| 29–5 February | Bandy | (Sweden) 2017 Bandy World Championship | International | Sweden |
| 30–5 February | Nordic skiing | (United States) 2017 Nordic Junior World Ski Championships | International | Russia |
