= April 2017 in sports =

List of sports events in 2017

<<	April 2017					>>
Su	Mo	Tu	We	Th	Fr	Sa
						1
2	3	4	5	6	7	8
9	10	11	12	13	14	15
16	17	18	19	20	21	22
23	24	25	26	27	28	29
30
Sports

This list shows notable sports-related events and notable outcomes that occurred in April of 2017.

== Events calendar ==
Date	Sport	Venue/Event	Status	Winner/s
1	Formula E	2017 Mexico City ePrix	International	(Brazil) Lucas di Grassi ( (Germany) Abt Sportsline)
1–9	Curling	(Canada) 2017 Ford World Men's Curling Championship	International	Canada (Skip: Brad Gushue)
1–10	Fencing	(Bulgaria) 2017 Junior and Cadet World Fencing Championships	International	Russia
1–11	Weightlifting	(Thailand) 2017 Youth World Weightlifting Championships	International	China
1–12 November	Motorsport	(European Union) / (Canada) / (South Africa) 2017 FIA World Rallycross Championship	International	Supercar WRX: Johan Kristoffersson ( Volkswagen RX Sweden); Supercar ERX: Anton Marklund ( Marklund Motorsport); Super 1600: (Hungary) Krisztián Szabó; Touringcar: (Norway) Lars-Øivind Enerberg; RX2: (France) Cyril Raymond
2	Road bicycle racing	(Belgium) 2017 Tour of Flanders ('Monument' #2)	International	(Belgium) Philippe Gilbert ( (Belgium) Quick-Step Floors)
2	Triathlon	(New Zealand) 2017 ITU Triathlon World Cup #3	International	Men: (South Africa) Richard Murray; Women: (United States) Katie Zaferes
2–8	Ice hockey	(South Korea) 2017 IIHF World U18 Championship Division II – Group A	International	Romania was promoted to Division I – Group B Croatia was relegated to Division II – Group B
2–8	Ice hockey	(South Korea) 2017 IIHF Women's World Championship Division II – Group A	International	South Korea was promoted to Division I – Group B Australia was relegated to Division II – Group B
2–8	Weightlifting	(Croatia) 2017 European Weightlifting Championships	Continental	Russia
2–1 October	Baseball	(United States) / (Canada) 2017 Major League Baseball season	Domestic	American League: (Texas) Houston Astros; National League: (California) Los Angeles Dodgers
3–9	Ice hockey	(Romania) 2017 IIHF World Championship Division II – Group A	International	Romania was promoted to Division I – Group B Spain was relegated to Division II – Group B
4–10	Ice hockey	(New Zealand) 2017 IIHF World Championship Division II – Group B	International	China was promoted to Division II – Group A Turkey was relegated to Division III
5–12	Futsal	(Argentina) 2017 Copa América de Futsal	Continental	Brazil
6–9	Rallying	(France) 2017 Tour de Corse (WRC #4)	International	(Belgium) Thierry Neuville & Nicolas Gilsoul ( (South Korea) Hyundai)
6–9	Golf	(United States) 2017 Masters Tournament	International	(Spain) Sergio García
7–8	Synchronized skating	(United States) 2017 ISU World Synchronized Skating Championships	International	(Russia) Paradise
7–9	Rugby sevens	2017 Hong Kong Sevens (WRSS #7)	International	Fiji
7–13	Ice hockey	(Slovenia) 2017 IIHF World U18 Championship Division I – Group A	International	France was promoted to Top Division; Hungary was relegated to Division I – Group B
7–14	Squash	(Egypt) 2016 Women's World Open Squash Championship	International	(Egypt) Nour El Sherbini
7–17	Ultramarathon	(Morocco) 2017 Marathon des Sables	International	Men: (Morocco) Rachid El Morabity; Women: (Sweden) Elisabet Barnes
8	Horse racing	(England) 2017 Grand National	International	(Republic of Ireland) One For Arthur (Jockey: (Republic of Ireland) Derek Fox)
8–9	Triathlon	(Australia) 2017 ITU World Triathlon Series #2	International	Men: (Spain) Mario Mola; Women: (New Zealand) Andrea Hewitt
8–14	Ice hockey	(Poland) 2017 IIHF Women's World Championship Division I – Group B	International	Slovakia was promoted to Division I – Group A Poland was relegated to Division II – Group A
12 October 2016–9	Ice hockey	(United States) / (Canada) 2016–17 NHL season	Domestic	Presidents' Trophy: (Washington, D.C.) Washington Capitals; Scoring winner: (Ontario) Connor McDavid ( (Alberta) Edmonton Oilers); Goaltender winner: (Russia) Sergei Bobrovsky ( (Ohio) Columbus Blue Jackets)
9	Formula One	(China) 2017 Chinese Grand Prix	International	(United Kingdom) Lewis Hamilton ( (Germany) Mercedes)
9	Motorcycle racing	(Argentina) 2017 Argentine motorcycle Grand Prix	International	MotoGP: (Spain) Maverick Viñales ( (Japan) Movistar Yamaha MotoGP); Moto2: (Italy) Franco Morbidelli ( (Belgium) EG 0,0 Marc VDS); Moto3: (Spain) Joan Mir ( (Germany) Leopard Racing)
9	Road bicycle racing	(France) 2017 Paris–Roubaix ('Monument' #3)	International	(Belgium) Greg Van Avermaet ( (United States) BMC Racing Team)
9–16	Table tennis	(China) 2017 Asian Table Tennis Championships	Continental	Men: (China) Fan Zhendong; Women: (Japan) Miu Hirano
9–1 December	Motorsport	(European Union) / (Morocco) / (Argentina) / (China) / (Japan) / (Macau) / (Qatar) 2017 World Touring Car Championship	International	(Sweden) Thed Björk ( (Sweden) Polestar Cyan Racing)
10–16	Ice hockey	(Bulgaria) 2017 IIHF World Championship Division III	International	Luxembourg was promoted to Division II – Group B
25 October 2016–12	Basketball	(United States) / (Canada) 2016–17 NBA season	Domestic	Top Seed: (California) Golden State Warriors; Top Scorer: (California) Russell Westbrook ( Oklahoma City Thunder)
12–16	Track cycling	(Hong Kong) 2017 UCI Track Cycling World Championships	International	Australia
12–11 June	Ice hockey	(United States) / (Canada) 2017 Stanley Cup playoffs	Domestic	(Pennsylvania) Pittsburgh Penguins; MVP: (Nova Scotia) Sidney Crosby
13–23	Ice hockey	(Slovakia) 2017 IIHF World U18 Championships	International	United States
14–16	Judo	(Madagascar) 2017 African Judo Championships	Continental	Algeria
14–15 October	Motorsport	(European Union) 2017 FIA Formula 3 European Championship	International	(United Kingdom) Lando Norris ( (United Kingdom) Carlin Motorsport)
15–16	Rugby sevens	2017 Singapore Sevens (WRSS #8)	International	Canada
15–16	Endurance motorcycle racing	(France) 2017 24 Heures Moto (EWC #2)	International	Winners: (Spain) David Checa, (Italy) Niccolò Canepa, (France) Mike Di Meglio ( (France) GTM94 Yamaha)
15–18	Athletics	(Curaçao) 2017 CARIFTA Games	Continental	Jamaica
15–21	Ice hockey	(Slovenia) 2017 IIHF World U18 Championships Division I – Group B	International	Slovenia was promoted to Division I – Group A Poland was relegated to Division II – Group A
15–21	Ice hockey	(Austria) 2017 IIHF Women's World Championship Division I – Group A	International	Japan was promoted to Top Division; France was relegated to Division I – Group B
15–23	Tennis	(Monaco) 2017 Monte-Carlo Masters	International	(Spain) Rafael Nadal
15–1 May	Snooker	(England) 2017 World Snooker Championship	International	(England) Mark Selby
15–12 June	Basketball	(United States) / (Canada) 2017 NBA Playoffs	Domestic	(California) Golden State Warriors; MVP: (Washington, D.C.) Kevin Durant (Golden State Warriors)
15–22 October	Motorsport	(European Union) 2017 European Le Mans Series	International	LMP2: (Russia) G-Drive Racing; LMP3: (United States) United Autosports; LMGTE: (United Kingdom) JMW Motorsport
15–26 November	Motorsport	(European Union) / (Bahrain) / (Monaco) / (Azerbaijan) / (United Arab Emirates) 2017 FIA Formula 2 Championship	International	(Monaco) Charles Leclerc ( (Italy) Prema Powerteam)
16	Formula One	2017 Bahrain Grand Prix	International	(Germany) Sebastian Vettel ( (Italy) Ferrari)
16–18 November	Motorsport	(European Union) / (Mexico) / (United States) / (Japan) / (China) / (Bahrain) 2017 FIA World Endurance Championship	International	LMP1: (New Zealand) Brendon Hartley, (New Zealand) Earl Bamber, & (Germany) Timo Bernhard; LMP2: (Brazil) Bruno Senna & (France) Julien Canal; LMGTE Pro: (Italy) Alessandro Pier Guidi & (United Kingdom) James Calado; LMGTE Am: (Austria) Mathias Lauda, (Canada) Paul Dalla Lana, & (Portugal) Pedro Lamy
17	Athletics	(United States) 2017 Boston Marathon (WMM #2)	International	Men: (Kenya) Geoffrey Kirui; Women: (Kenya) Edna Kiplagat
19–23	Artistic gymnastics	(Romania) 2017 European Artistic Gymnastics Championships	Continental	Russia
20–23	Figure skating	(Japan) 2017 ISU World Team Trophy in Figure Skating	International	Japan
20–23	Judo	(Poland) 2017 European Judo Championships	Continental	France
21–29	Weightlifting	(Turkmenistan) 2017 Asian Weightlifting Championships	Continental	China
21–30	Multi-sport	(New Zealand) 2017 World Masters Games	International	For results, click here.
21–7 May	Association football	(Panama) 2017 CONCACAF U-17 Championship	Continental	Mexico
22–23	Athletics	(The Bahamas) 2017 IAAF World Relays	International	United States
22–23	Rugby sevens	2017 Japan Women's Sevens (WRWSS #4)	International	New Zealand
22–28	Ice hockey	(Ukraine) 2017 IIHF World Championship Division I – Group A	International	Austria and South Korea were promoted to Top Division; Ukraine was relegated to Division I – Group B
22–29	Curling	(Canada) 2017 World Mixed Doubles Curling Championship (Canada) 2017 World Senior Curling Championships	International	Mixed doubles: Switzerland (Martin Rios & Jenny Perret); Men's senior: Sweden (Skip: Mats Wrana); Women's senior: Canada (Skip: Colleen Jones)
22–30	Volleyball	(Hungary) / (Slovakia) 2017 Boys' U19 Volleyball European Championship	Continental	Czech Republic
22–3 June	Rugby union	(Hong Kong) / (Japan) / (South Korea) 2017 Asia Rugby Championship	Continental	Japan
23	Motorcycle racing	(United States) 2017 Motorcycle Grand Prix of the Americas	International	MotoGP: (Spain) Marc Márquez ( (Japan) Repsol Honda); Moto2: (Italy) Franco Morbidelli ( (Belgium) EG 0,0 Marc VDS); Moto3: (Italy) Romano Fenati ( (Italy) Marinelli Rivacold Snipers)
23	Athletics	(United Kingdom) 2017 London Marathon (WMM #3)	International	Men: (Kenya) Daniel Wanjiru; Women: (Kenya) Mary Keitany
23	Road bicycle racing	(Belgium) 2017 Liège–Bastogne–Liège ('Monument' #4)	International	(Spain) Alejandro Valverde ( (Spain) Movistar Team)
23–29	Ice hockey	(United Kingdom) 2017 IIHF World Championship Division I – Group B	International	Great Britain was promoted to Division I – Group A Netherlands was relegated to Division II – Group A
24	Association football	(Switzerland) 2017 UEFA Youth League Final	Continental	(Austria) Red Bull Salzburg
25–30	Badminton	(Denmark) 2017 European Badminton Championships	Continental	Men: (England) Rajiv Ouseph; Women: (Spain) Carolina Marín
2 August 2016–26	Association football	2016–17 CONCACAF Champions League	Continental	(Mexico) C.F. Pachuca
26–30	Amateur wrestling	(Morocco) 2017 African Wrestling Championships	Continental	Men's Freestyle/Greco-Roman: Egypt; Women's Freestyle: Nigeria
27–29	American football	(United States) 2017 NFL draft	Domestic	#1 pick: Myles Garrett (to the (Ohio) Cleveland Browns from the Texas A&M Aggies)
27–30	Rallying	2017 Rally Argentina (WRC #5)	International	(Belgium) Thierry Neuville & Nicolas Gilsoul ( (South Korea) Hyundai)
27–7 May	Beach soccer	(The Bahamas) 2017 FIFA Beach Soccer World Cup	International	Brazil
28–30	Basketball	(Spain) 2017 Basketball Champions League Final Four	Continental	(Spain) Iberostar Tenerife
28–8 October	Motorsport	(European Union) 2017 European Touring Car Cup	Continental	(Czech Republic) Petr Fulín ( (Czech Republic) Křenek Motorsport)
28–26 November	Rallying	(New Zealand) / (Australia) / (China) / (Malaysia) / (Japan) / (India) 2017 Asia-Pacific Rally Championship	Regional	Main: (India) Gaurav Gill; Asia Rally Cup: (India) Gaurav Gill; Pacific Rally Cup: (Norway) Ole Veiby
29–28 October	Motorcycle speedway	(European Union) / (Australia) 2017 Speedway Grand Prix	International	(Australia) Jason Doyle
29–29 October	Motorsport	(European Union) 2017 International GT Open	International	(Italy) Giovanni Venturini ( (Italy) Imperiale Racing)
30	Formula One	(Russia) 2017 Russian Grand Prix	International	(Finland) Valtteri Bottas ( (Germany) Mercedes)
30	Futsal	(Kazakhstan) 2017 UEFA Futsal Cup Final	Continental	(Spain) Inter FS
30–7 May	Amateur boxing	(Uzbekistan) 2017 Asian Amateur Boxing Championships	Continental	Uzbekistan
