= 2016 Breeders' Cup =

Thoroughbred horse racing event

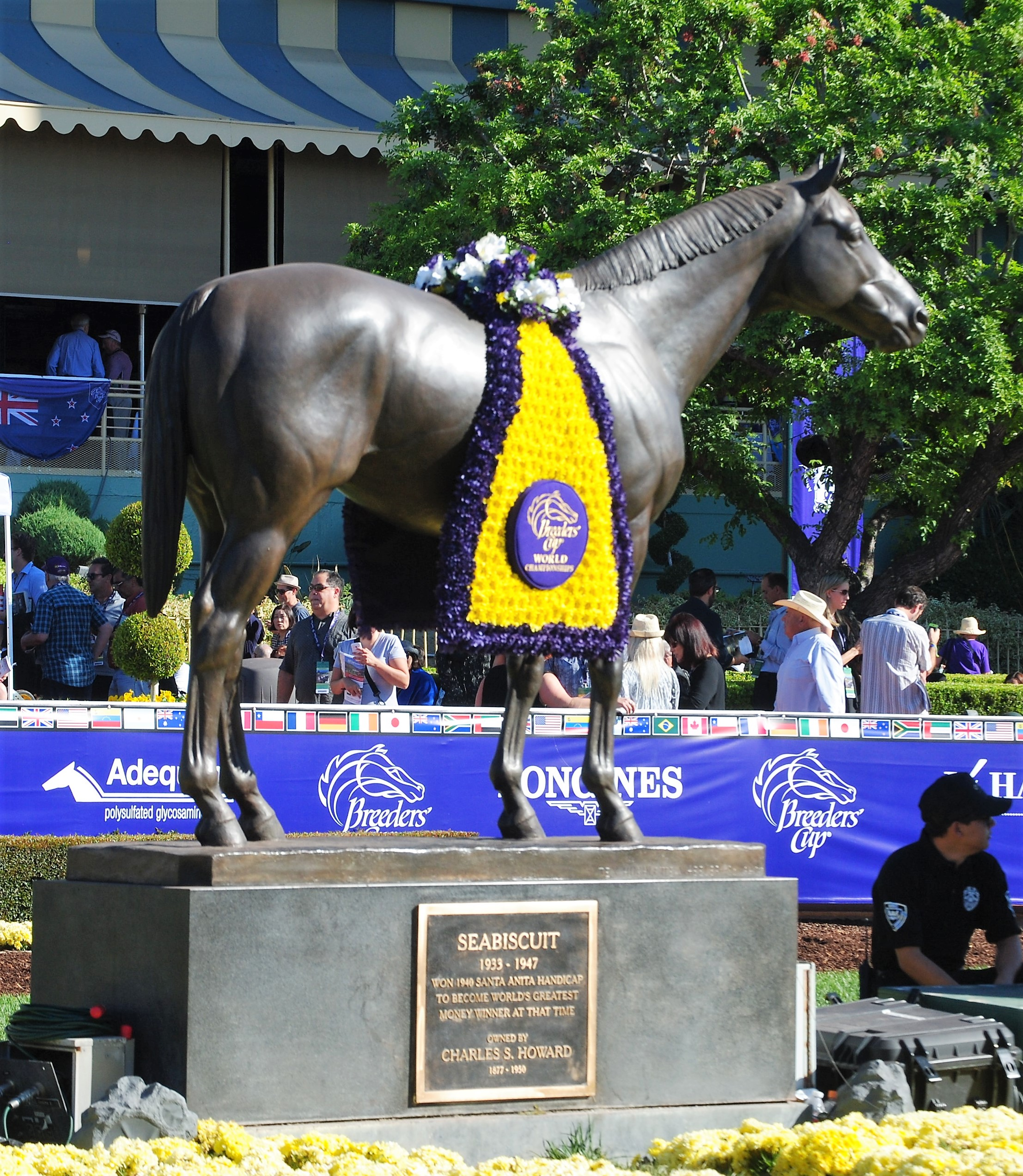
- Seabiscuit statue at Santa Anita, draped in a Breeders' Cup winner's blanket
- Class: Championship Event Series
- Location: Santa Anita Racetrack
- Race type: Thoroughbred
- Website: www.breederscup.com

Race information
- Distance: See individual races
- Surface: Turf, Dirt
- Track: Left-handed
- Purse: Varies by race; Between $1,000,000 – $6 million

The 2016 Breeders' Cup World Championships was the 33rd edition of the premier event of the North American thoroughbred horse racing year. A total of 185 pre-entries were announced on October 26 in what was considered a highly competitive year in most divisions. The races, all of which were Grade I, took place on November 4 and 5 at Santa Anita Racetrack in Arcadia, California and were telecast by NBC. The Breeders' Cup is generally regarded as the end of the North America racing season, although a few Grade I events take place in later November and December.

The most anticipated events were the Classic and Distaff. The Classic pitted the five-year-old California Chrome, undefeated in 2016, against Arrogate, a late developing three-year-old, with Arrogate prevailing by half a length. The Distaff featured a face-off between three Eclipse Award winners: Songbird (2015 champion two-year-old filly, undefeated in her career before the Breeders' Cup), Stellar Wind (2015 champion three-year-old filly) and Beholder (2015 champion older female). Beholder prevailed over Songbird by a nose.

== Breeders' Cup Challenge series ==
The Breeders' Cup Challenge is a series of races that provide the winners of designated races with automatic "Win and You're In" berths in a specified division of the Breeders' Cup. Forty-five entrants in the Breeders' Cup qualified via the Challenge series, which was particularly important as seven of the Breeders' Cup races were oversubscribed, in that there were more entries than available space. A maximum of 14 horses (12 in the Dirt Mile) are allowed to start in each race. Winners of the Challenge races are given automatic entries, while other pre-entries were ranked by a points system and the judgement of a panel of experts.

== Lead-up ==
In 2016, Santa Anita hosted the Breeders' Cup for a record ninth time. In preparation for the event, Santa Anita installed a new turf course over the summer of 2016. Early reviews were positive: the jockeys felt the course was very fast but safe and fair. "It's like a carpet right now," said jockey Kent Desormeaux. "It's pristine. It's incredible. But we'll see how it holds up."

NBC Sports telecast the Breeders' Cup from 4 PM to 8 PM (Eastern) on both Friday and Saturday, plus the Classic was broadcast on NBC from 8 PM to 9 PM on Saturday. All races were streamed live.

In the Classic division, California Chrome was the clear favorite after an undefeated season that included wins in the Dubai World Cup, Pacific Classic and Awesome Again. Arrogate, a three-year-old who did not win his first race until June, was the most highly regarded contender after his record-setting win in the Travers Stakes. Frosted, who qualified for both the Dirt Mile and Classic, took the more challenging option and was the most highly regarded east coast contender.

The field for the Distaff was considered one of the most competitive in its history. The early favorite was Songbird, the Champion two-year-old filly of 2015. Songbird had won all 11 of her starts by a combined 60 1/2 lengths but had never faced older horses. Stellar Wind, the 2015 three-year-old champion filly, qualified for the Breeders' Cup by beating Beholder in two "Win and You're In" races, the Clement L. Hirsch and Zenyatta. Beholder, a three-time Eclipse Award winner, came into the race off of a three-race losing streak, but was considered very dangerous.

Other anticipated match ups included the Turf, where Prix de l'Arc de Triomphe winner Found attempted to defend her 2015 win in the Turf against Flintshire, who had been dominant in the summer in North America on the Turf, and her stablemate and rival Highland Reel, who had finished second to Found in the Prix de l'Arc de Triomphe. Tepin attempted to defend her title in the Mile. All four races in the two-year-old division were considered wide open.

== Results ==
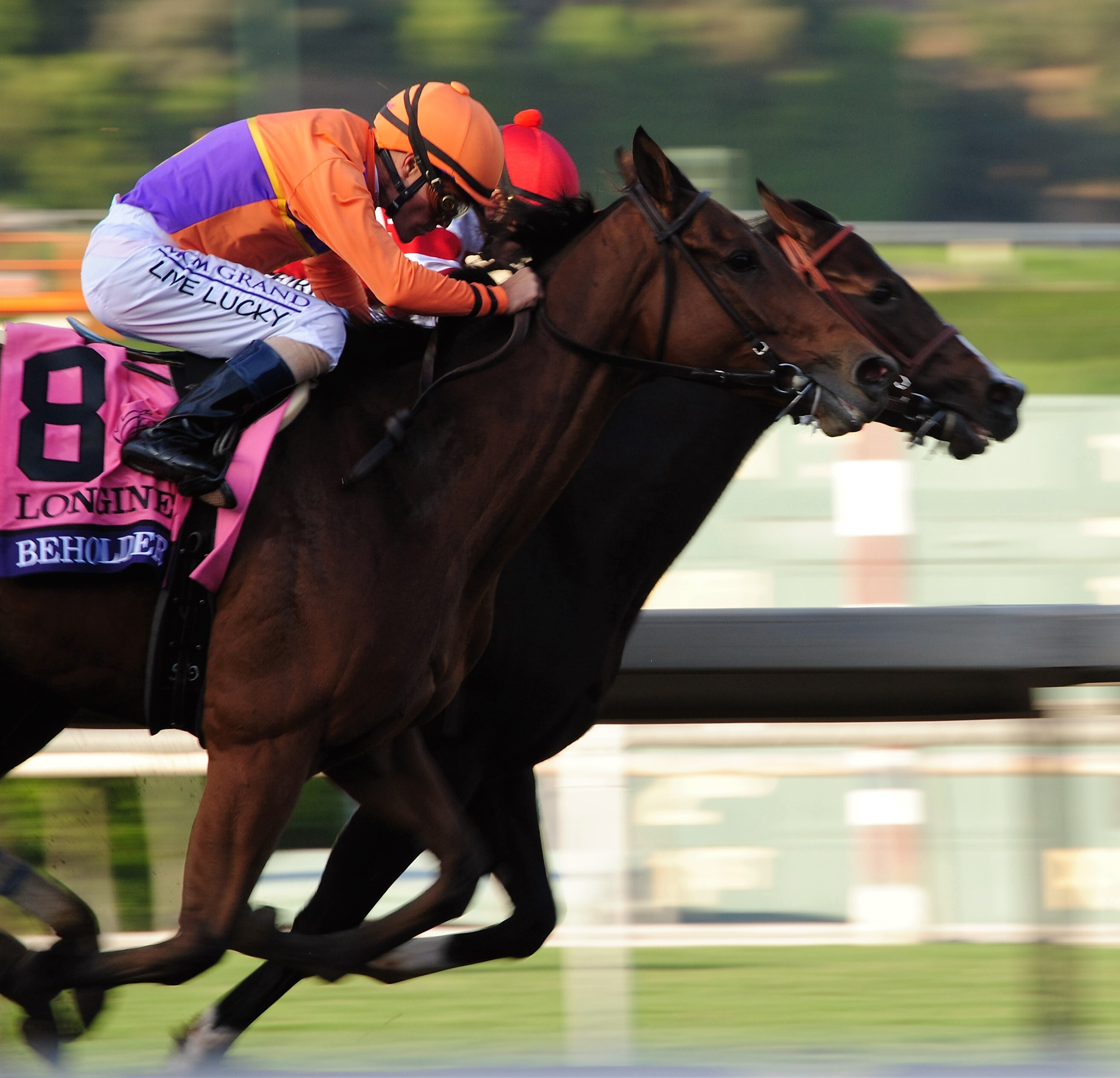
Songbird on the rail and Beholder on the outside dueled the length of the stretch in the Distaff

A record Friday crowd of 45,673 showed up on November 4 to watch the first four Breeders' Cup races, with the match up between Songbird and Beholder in the Distaff being the main draw. The race did not disappoint, with the Daily Racing Form and Forbes calling it a "race for the ages", while The Blood-Horse described it as "dramatic and epic". Songbird took the early lead with Beholder stalking a few lengths behind then moving closer around the final turn. As they entered the stretch, Beholder trailed by about a length but was closing ground with each stride. Songbird fought back and the two reached the wire together – a photo finish determined that Beholder had won by "barely more than a whisker."

Corona Del Inca was pulled up at the head of the stretch during the Distaff. Although she was able to walk into the nearby ambulance, her injuries proved extensive and she had to be euthanized.

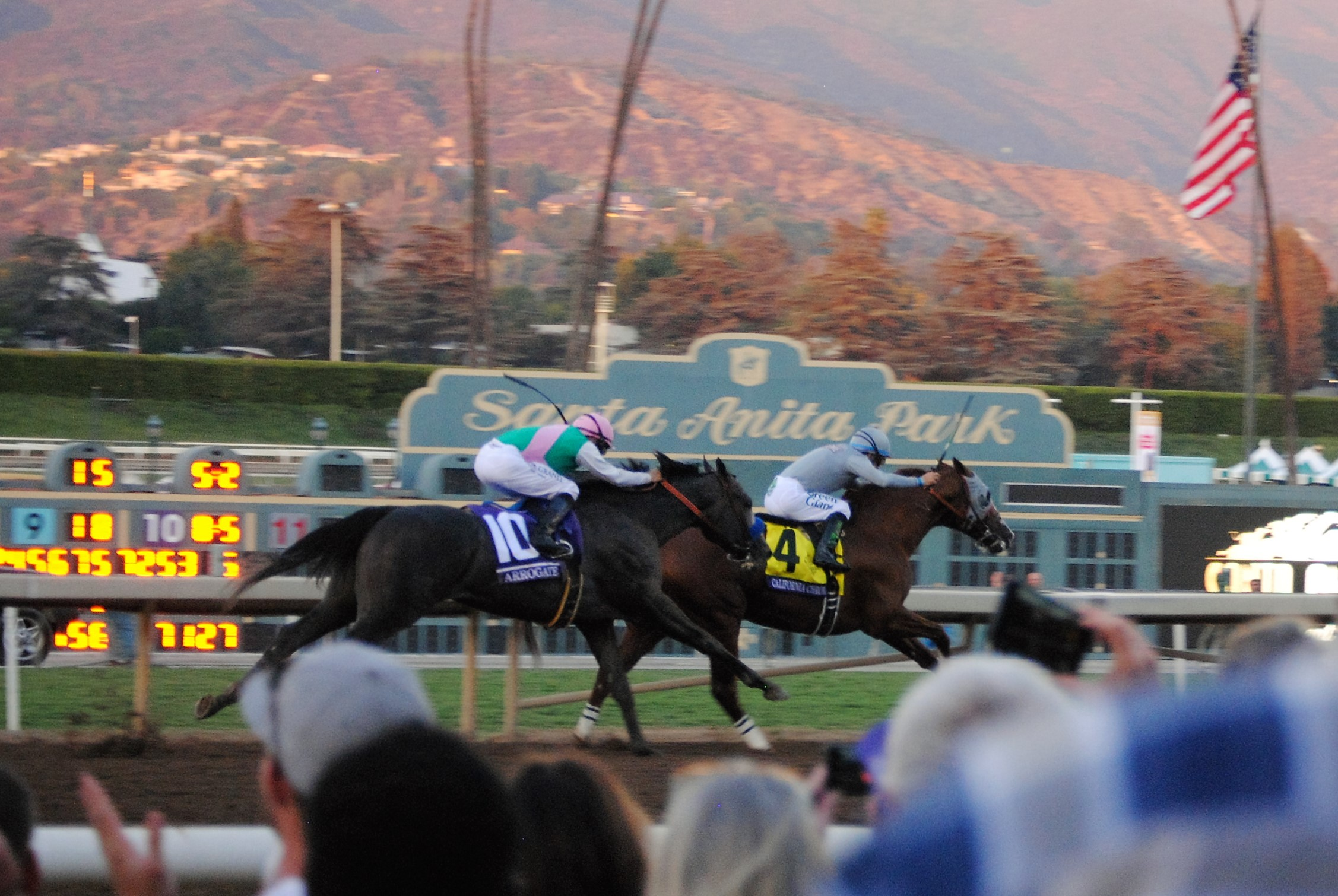
Arrogate making up ground on California Chrome in the Classic

On Saturday, the attendance was 72,811 – the highest single day attendance at the Breeders' Cup since it switched to a 2-day format in 2007. Common-pool wagering of $109 million for Saturday was up 3.2% compared to 2015, though short of the record of $119 million set in 2010.

The Classic was run in similar fashion to the Distaff, with California Chrome setting the pace and Arrogate stalking him a few lengths behind. As they rounded the final turn, Arrogate moved into second, trailing by a length and a half. California Chrome maintained that margin until mid-stretch, then Arrogate started to close, eventually winning by half a length. Keen Ice was over 10 lengths back in third. "Deep down, I really wasn't sure if we could beat California Chrome, because I still have total respect for the horse", said Arrogate's trainer Bob Baffert. "Turning for home, I thought I was going to run second, but there's nothing wrong with that, because Chrome is a really good horse, and running second to him is no bad thing ... I never thought he would be able to catch Chrome."

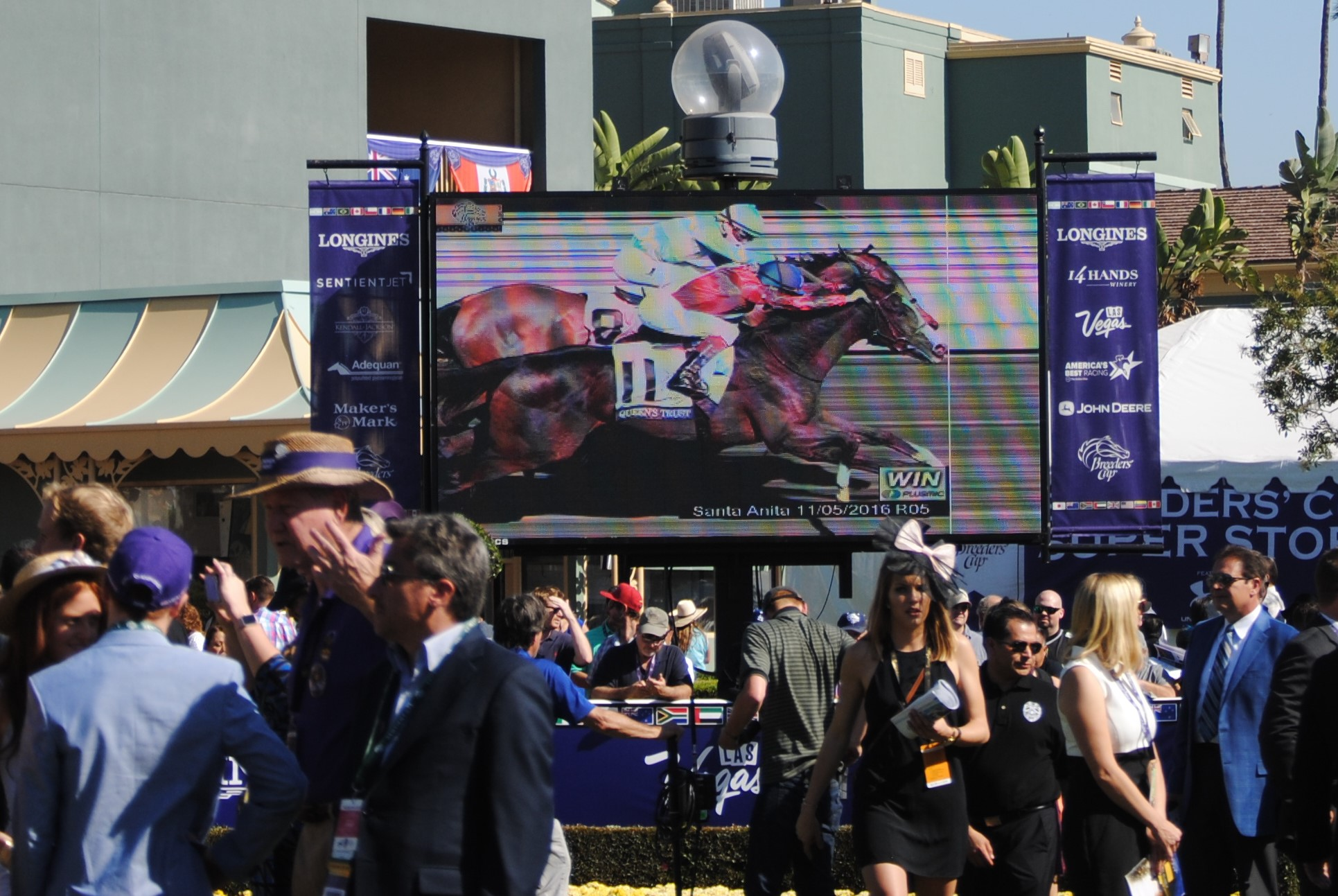
The photo finish in the Filly & Mare Turf, won by Queen's Trust

Other highlights included the Turf, in which Highland Reel went to an early lead and was able to open a large lead down the backstretch, then withstood a late run by Flintshire to win by 1 3/4 lengths. In the Mile, longshot Tourist prevailed by half a length over Tepin, who was attempting to defend her win in the 2015 renewal. The Filly & Mare Turf was won by Queen's Trust, who held off a late run by Lady Eli by a nose. And in the Juvenile, Classic Empire became the early favorite for the 2017 Kentucky Derby by prevailing over Not This Time by a neck.

Mike Smith won the Shoemaker Award for leading jockey at the event. He won three races (the Dirt Mile on Tamarkuz, the Filly & Mare Sprint on Finest City and the Classic on Arrogate) and finished second in three others. Smith was the only jockey to win multiple Breeders' Cup races in 2016.

=== Friday, November 4 ===
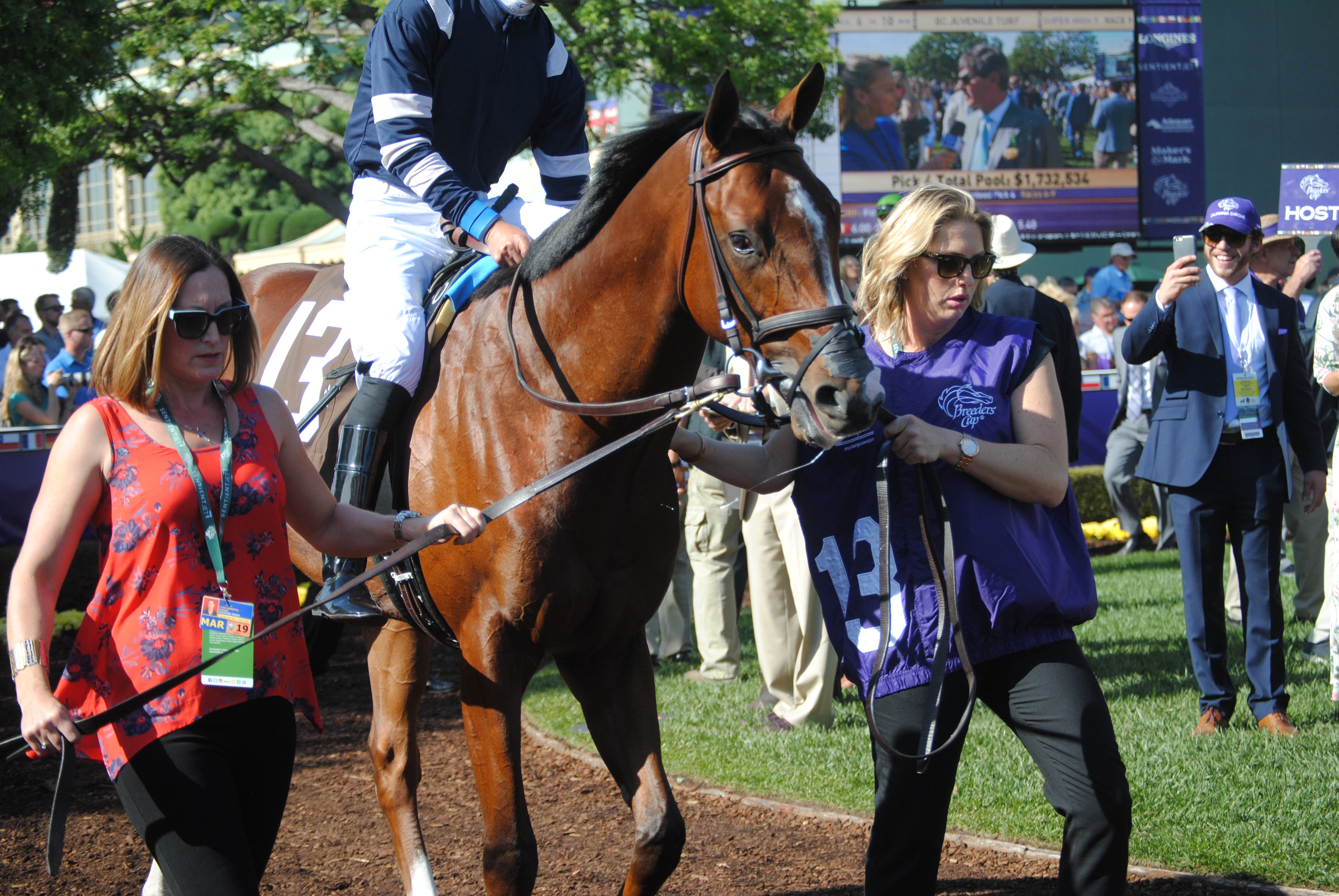
Oscar Performance, winner of the Juvenile Turf

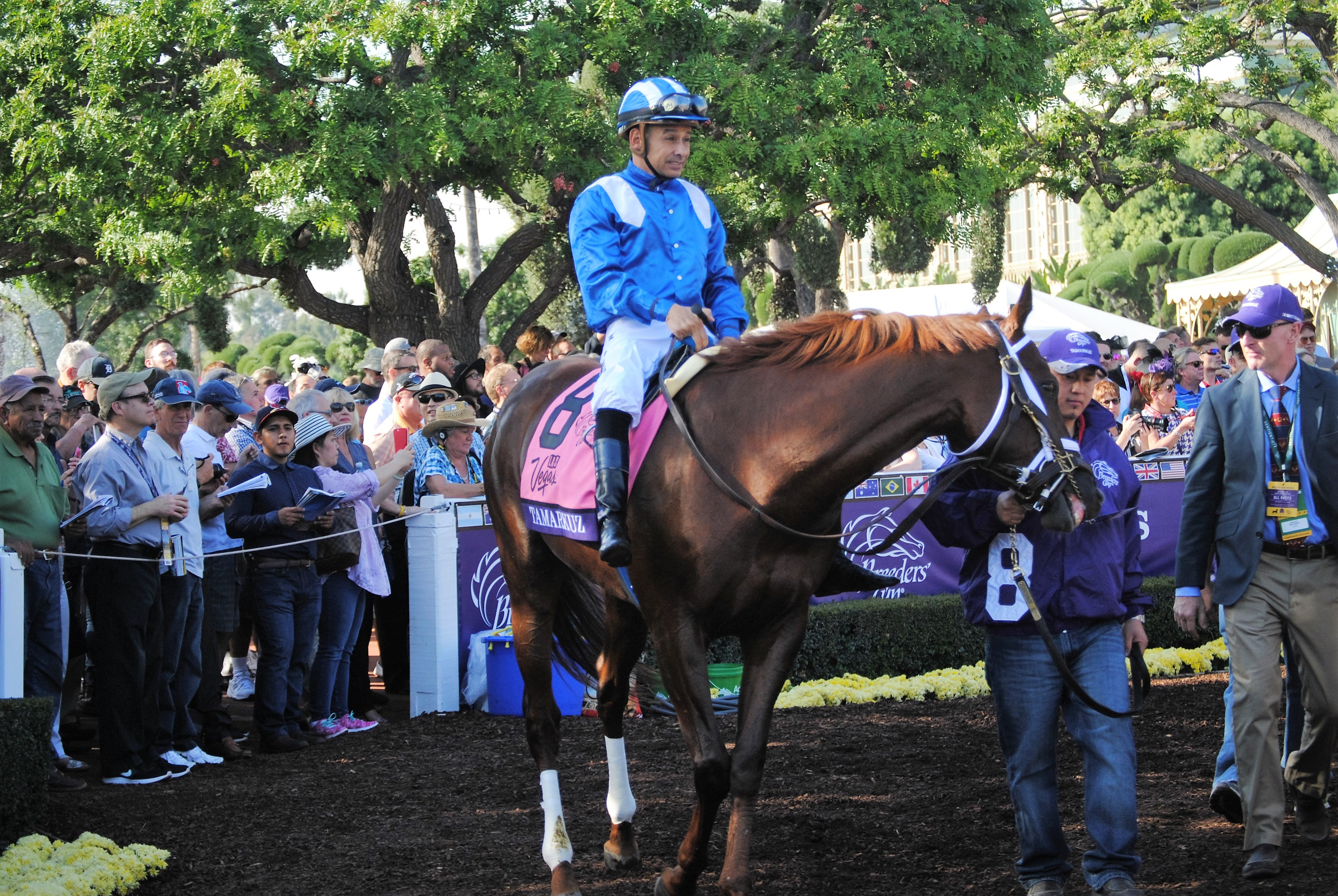
Tamarkuz, winner of the Dirt Mile

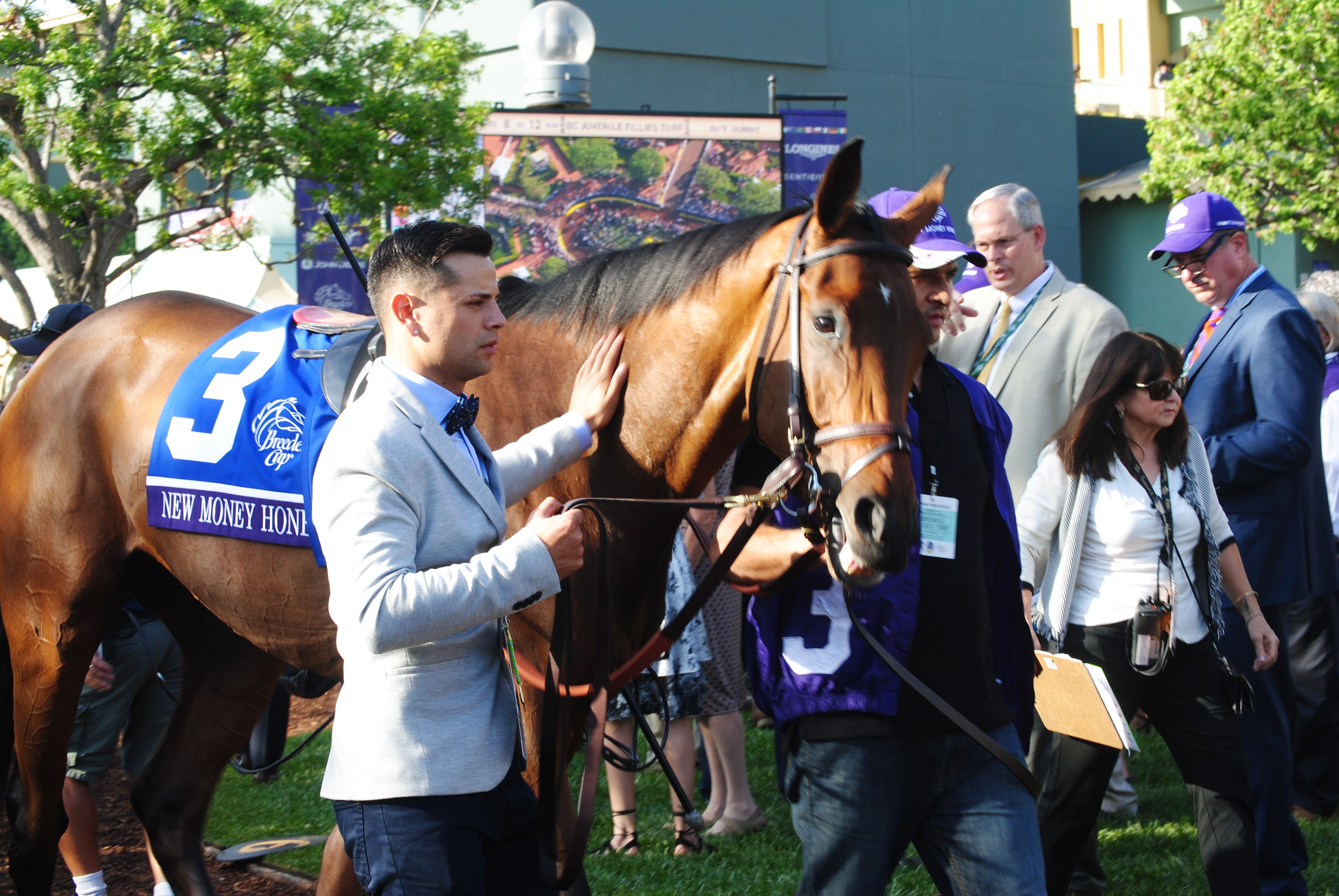
New Money Honey, winner of the Juvenile Fillies Turf

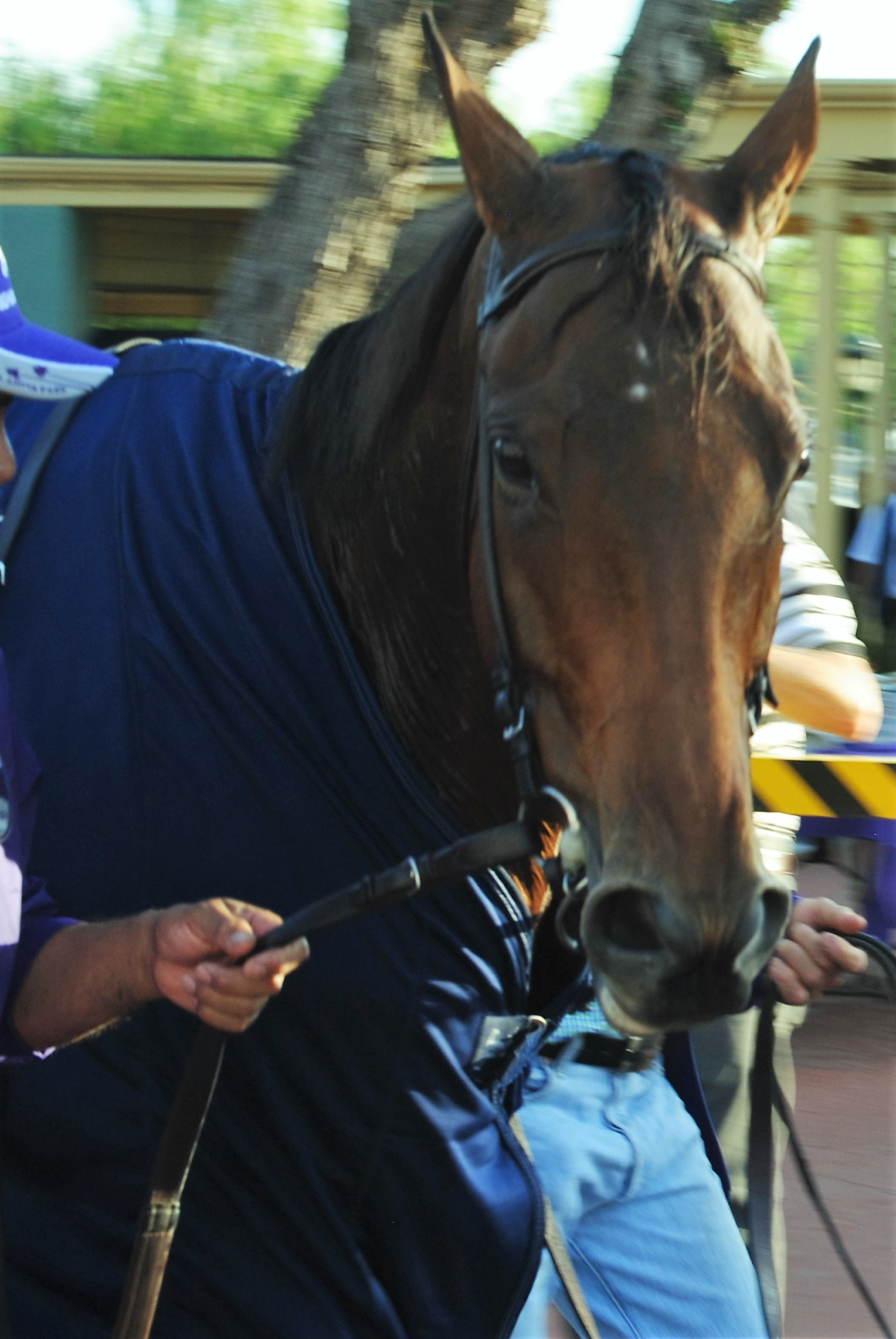
Beholder, winner of the Distaff

Race name	Post time (Pacific)	Sponsor	Distance/Surface	Restrictions	Purse	Winner (Bred)	Odds	Margin
Juvenile Turf	2:25 PM		1 mile (Turf)	2-year-old colts and geldings	$1 million	Oscar Performance	6.60	1 1/4 lengths
Dirt Mile	3:05 PM	City of Las Vegas	1 mile	3 yrs+	$1 million	Tamarkuz	11.90	3 1/2 lengths
Juvenile Fillies Turf	3:50 PM		1 mile (Turf)	2-year-old fillies	$1 million	New Money Honey	6.50	1/2 length
Distaff	4:35 PM	Longines	1 1/8 miles	3 yrs+ fillies & mares	$2 million	Beholder	3.30	nose

Source: Equibase

=== Saturday, November 5 ===
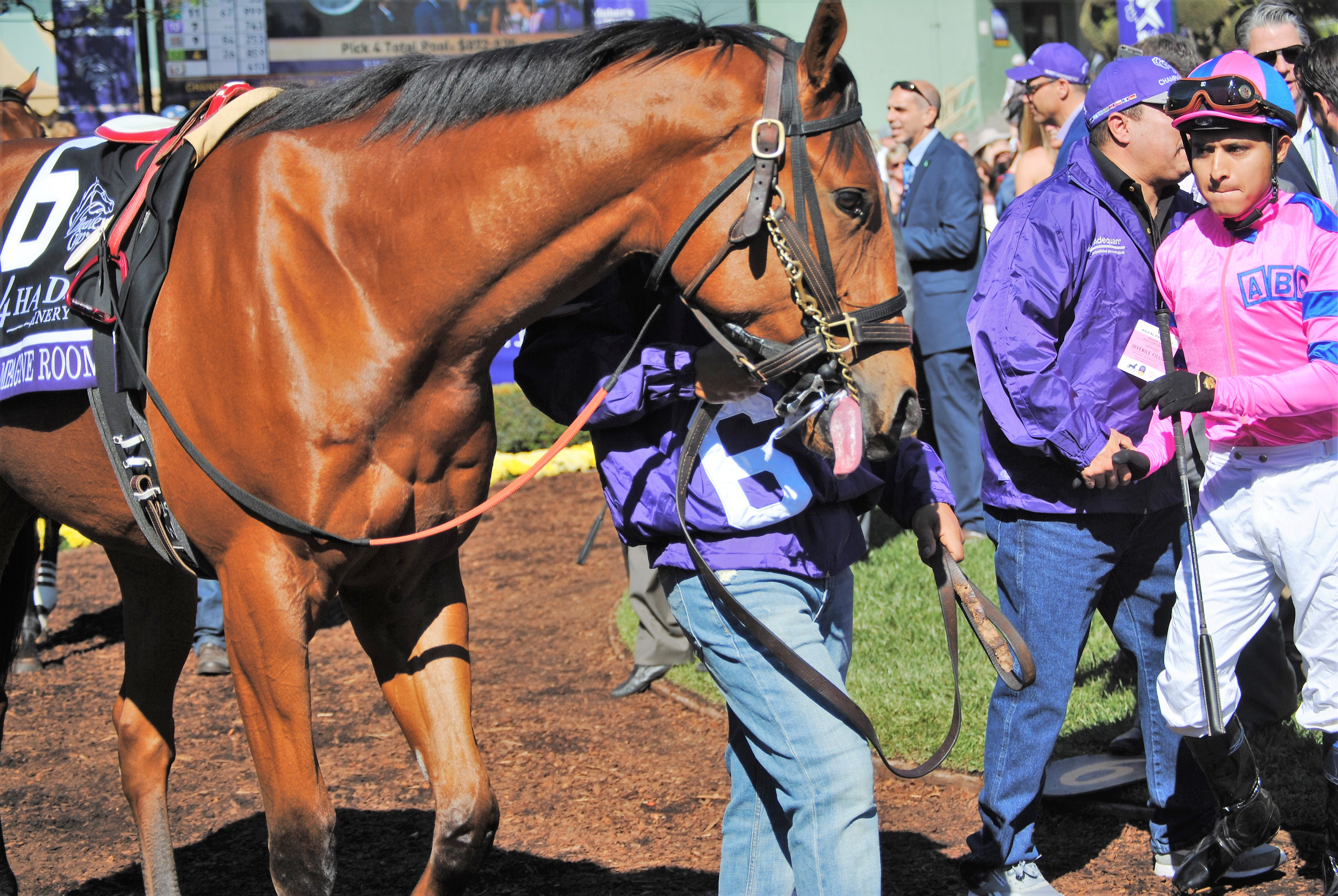
Juvenile Fillies winner Champagne Room

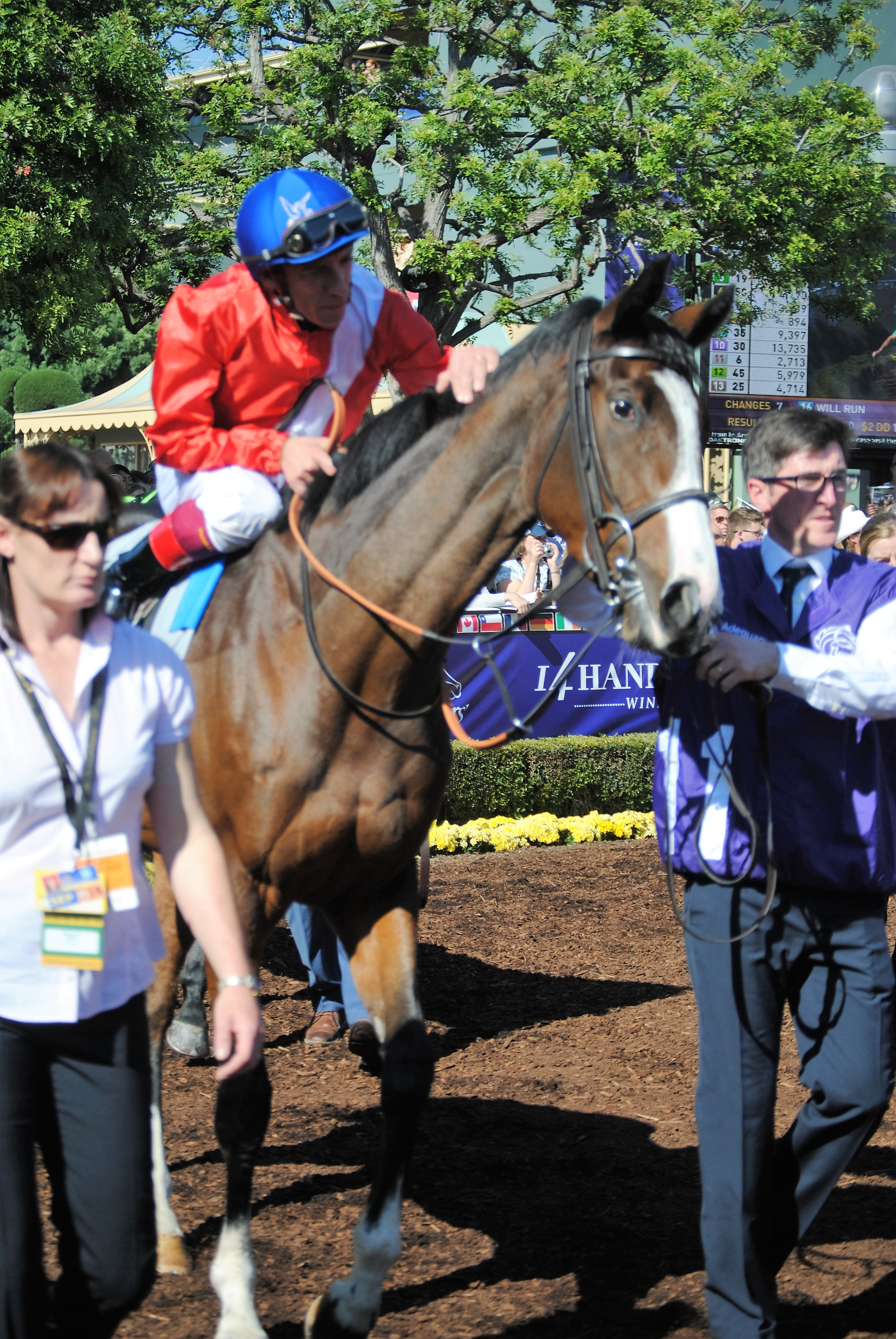
Filly & Mare Turf winner Queen's Trust

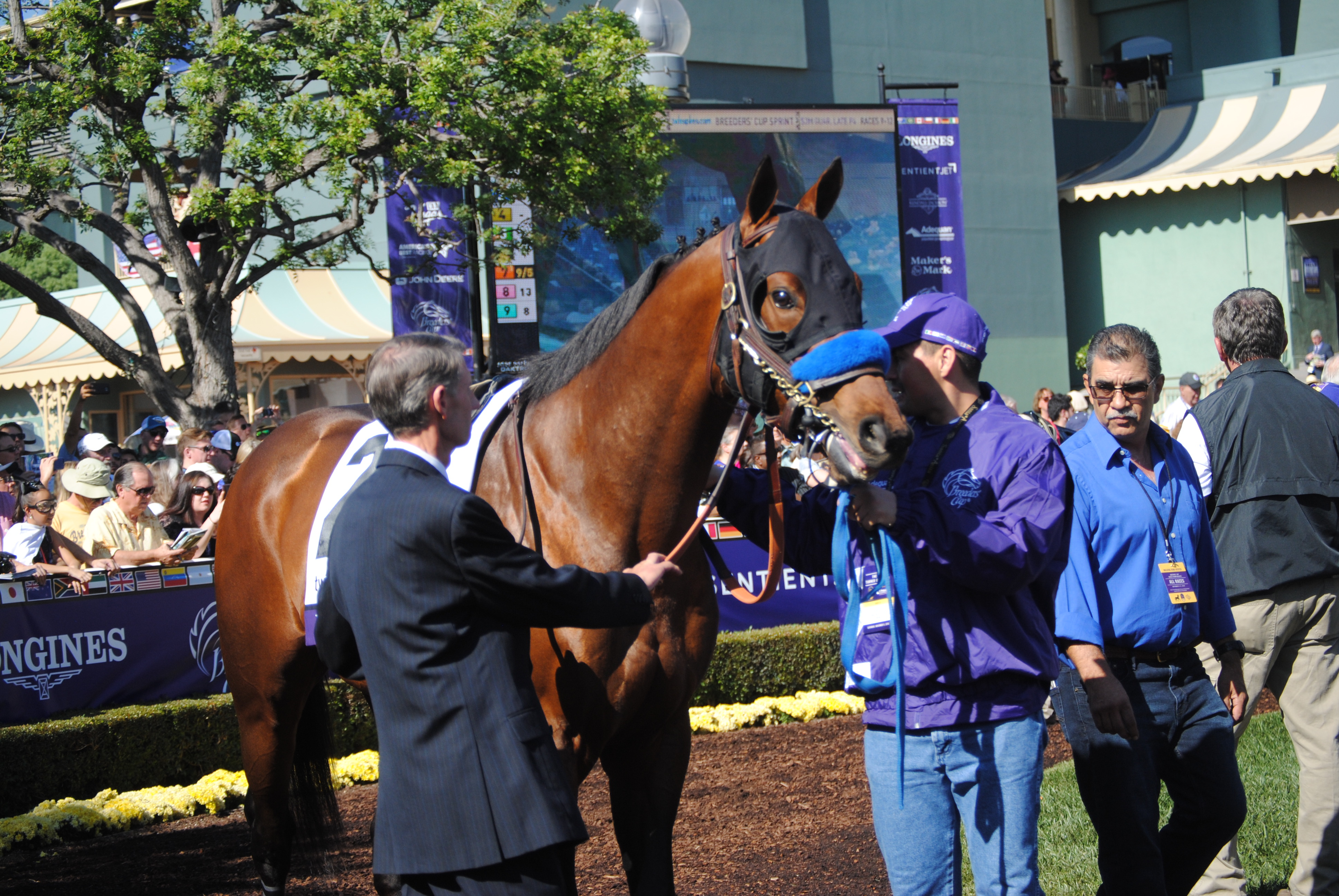
Sprint winner Drefong

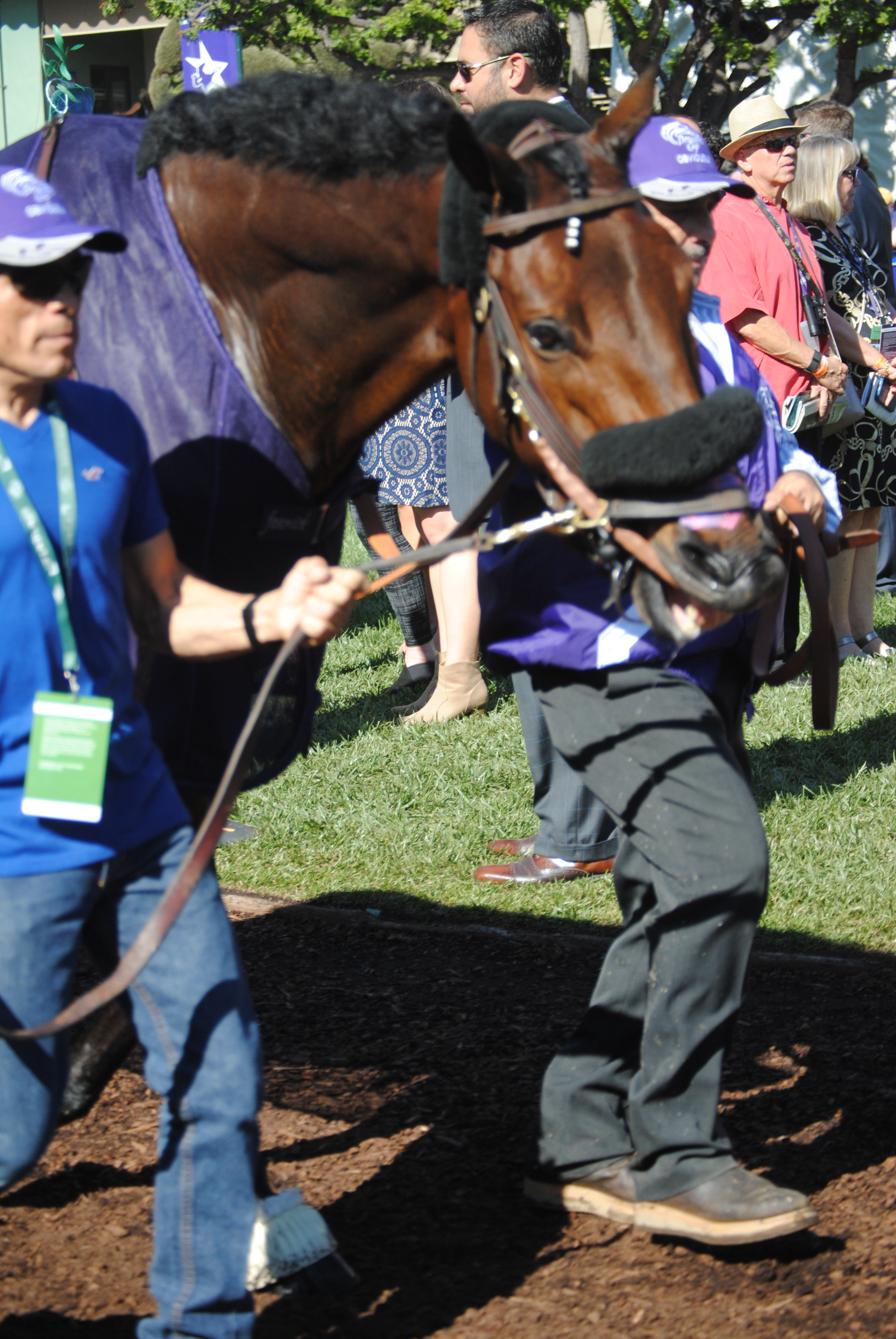
Turf Sprint winner Obviously

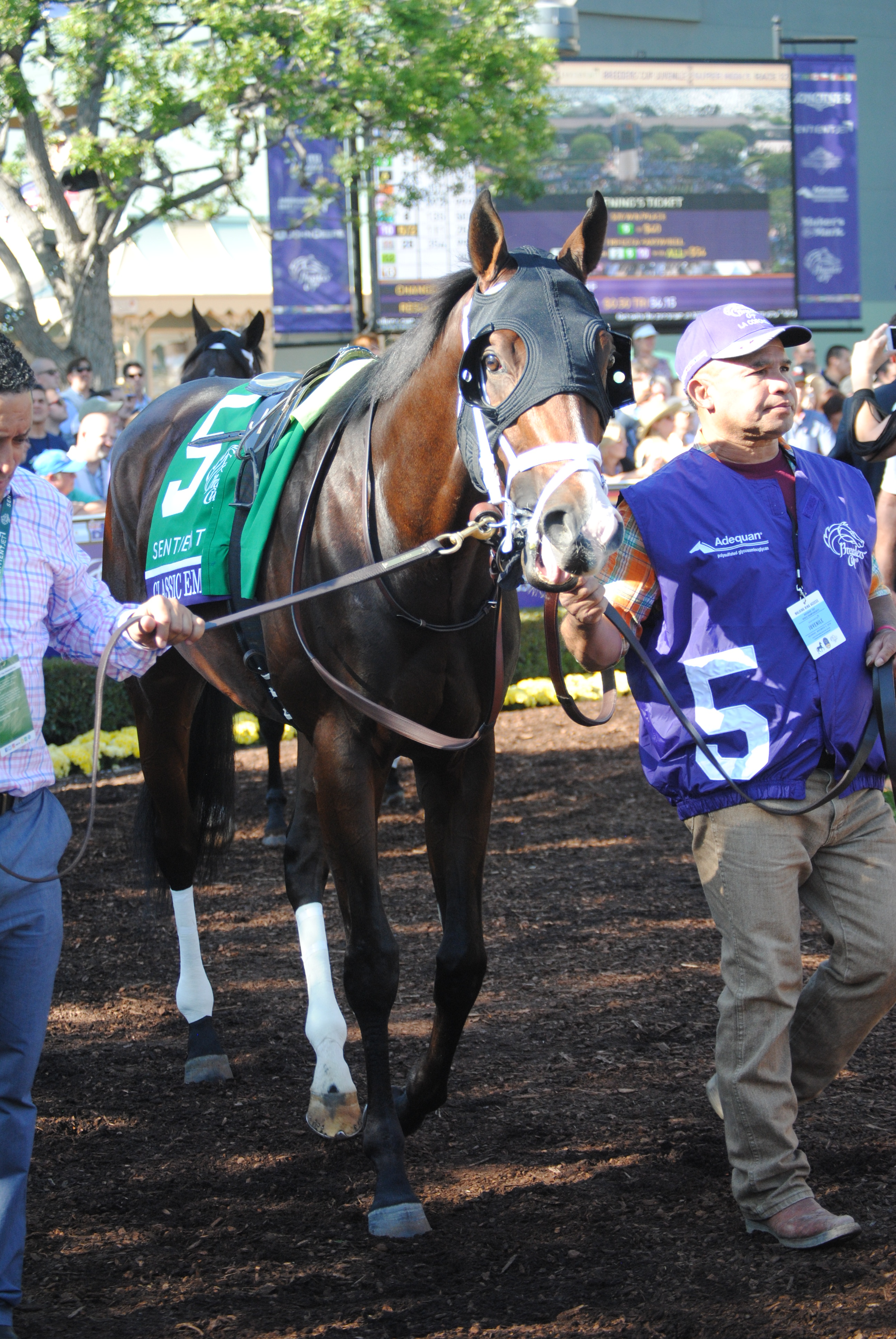
Juvenile winner Classic Empire

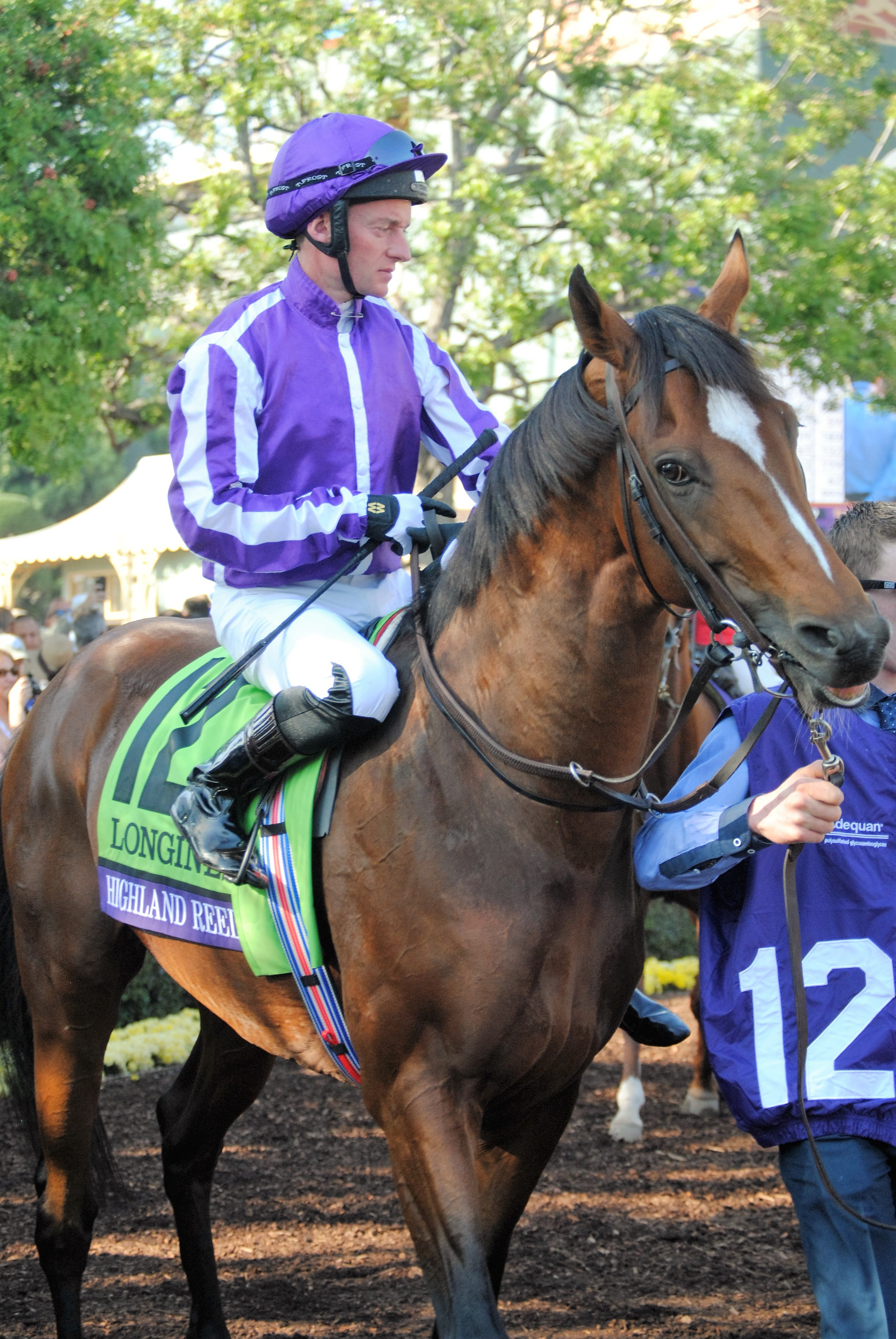
Turf winner Highland Reel

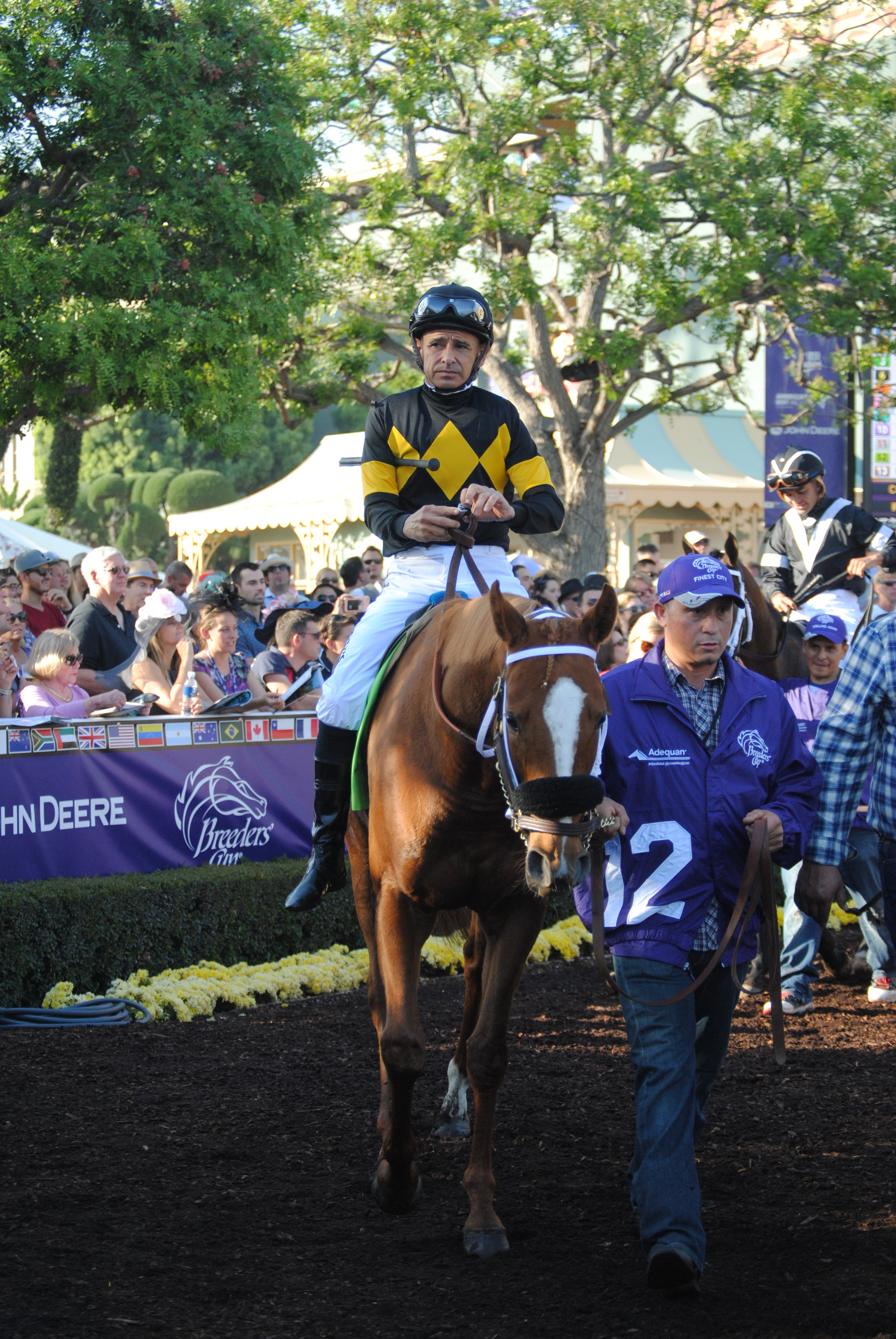
Filly & Mare Sprint winner Finest City

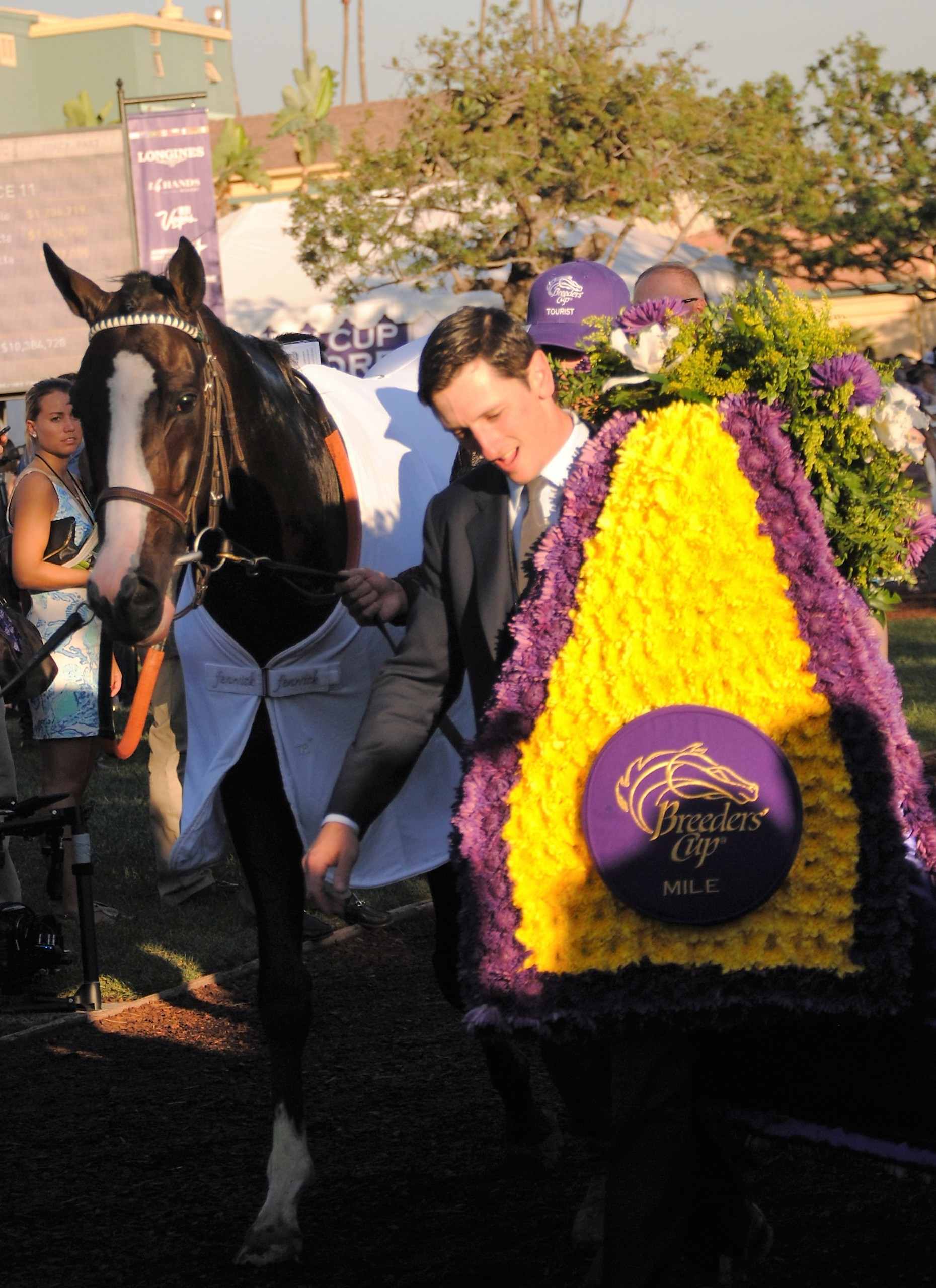
Mile winner Tourist

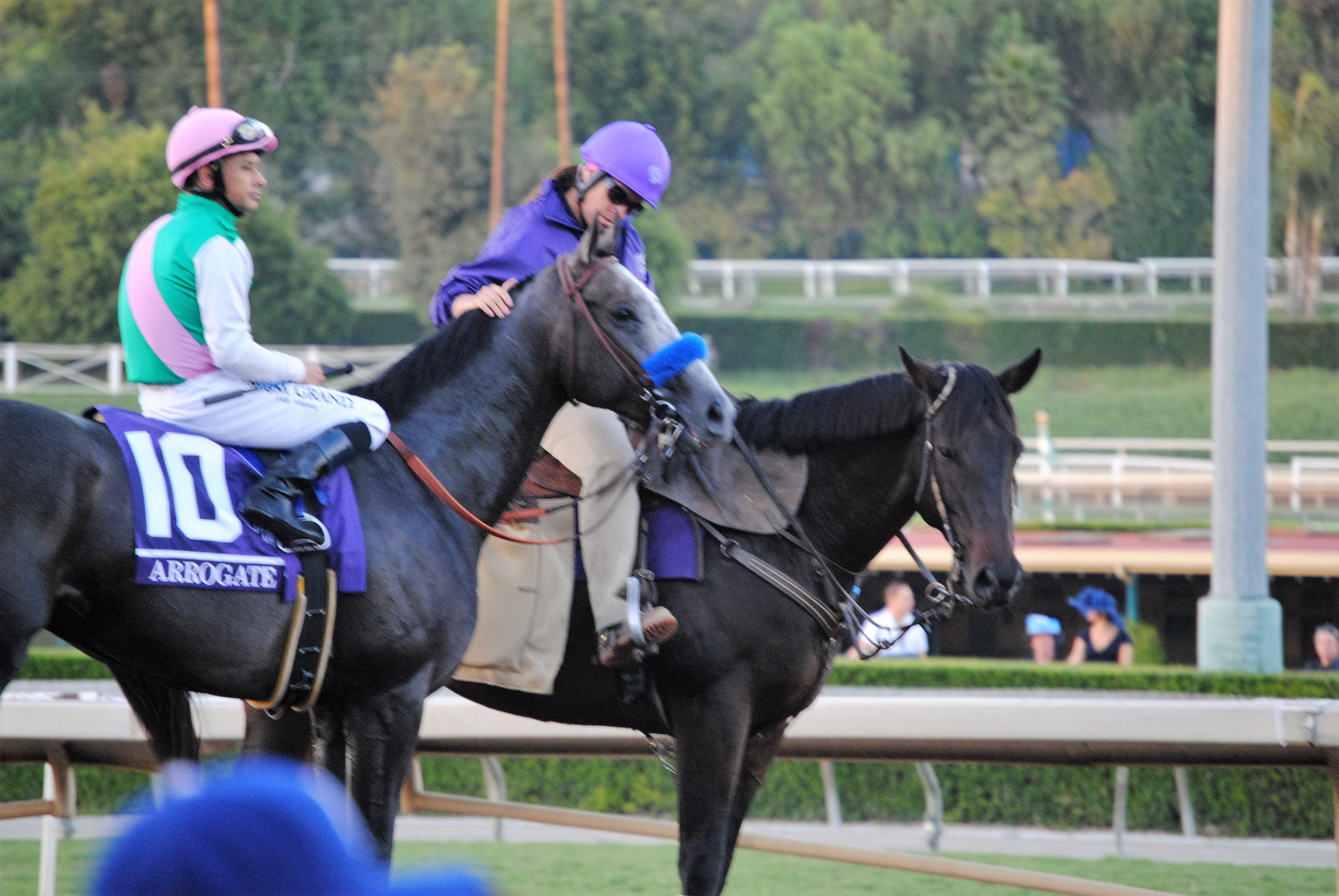
Classic winner Arrogate

Race Name	Post time (Pacific)	Sponsor	Distance/Surface	Restrictions	Purse	Winner (Bred)	Odds	Margin
Juvenile Fillies	12:05 PM	14 Hands Winery	1 1/16 miles	2-year-old fillies	$2 million	Champagne Room	33.60	3/4
Filly & Mare Turf	12:45 PM		1 1/4 miles (Turf)	3 yrs+ fillies & mares	$2 million	Queen's Trust (GB)	8.00	nose
Sprint	1:21 PM	TwinSpires	6 furlongs	3 yrs+	$1.5 million	Drefong	3.90	1 1/4
Turf Sprint	2:05 PM		abt.6 1/2 furlongs (Turf)	3 yrs+	$1 million	Obviously	3.80	nose
Juvenile	2:43 PM	Sentient Jet	1 1/16 miles	2-year-old colts and geldings	$2 million	Classic Empire	4.50	neck
Turf	3:22 PM	Longines	1 1/2 miles (Turf)	3 yrs+	$4 million	Highland Reel	3.80	1 3/4
Filly & Mare Sprint	4:02 PM		7 furlongs	3 yrs+ fillies & mares	$1 million	Finest City	8.70	3/4
Mile	4:40 PM		1 mile (Turf)	3 yrs+	$2 million	Tourist	12.40	1/2
Classic	5:35 PM		1 1/4 miles	3 yrs+	$6 million	Arrogate	1.70	1/2

Source: Equibase
