= May 2016 in sports =

<<	May 2016					>>
Su	Mo	Tu	We	Th	Fr	Sa
1	2	3	4	5	6	7
8	9	10	11	12	13	14
15	16	17	18	19	20	21
22	23	24	25	26	27	28
29	30	31
Sports

This list shows notable sports-related events and notable outcomes that occurred in May of 2016.

== Events calendar ==
Date	Sport	Venue/Event	Status	Winner/s
1	Formula One	(Russia) 2016 Russian Grand Prix	International	(Germany) Nico Rosberg ( (Germany) Mercedes)
2–8	Tennis	(Spain) 2016 Madrid Open	International	Men: (Serbia) Novak Djokovic; Women: (Romania) Simona Halep
4–16	Association football	(Belarus) 2016 UEFA Women's Under-17 Championship	Continental	Germany
5–21	Association football	(Azerbaijan) 2016 UEFA European Under-17 Championship	Continental	Portugal
6	Athletics	Qatar Athletic Super Grand Prix (DL #1)	International	United States
6–8	Rowing	(Germany) 2016 European Rowing Championships	Continental	(United Kingdom) Great Britain
6–22	Ice hockey	(Russia) 2016 IIHF World Championship	International	Canada
6–29	Road bicycle racing	(Italy) 2016 Giro d'Italia	International	(Italy) Vincenzo Nibali ( (Kazakhstan) Astana)
7	Horse racing	(United States) 2016 Kentucky Derby (US Triple Crown #1)	Domestic	(United States) Nyquist (Jockey: (Mexico) Mario Gutierrez)
7–8	Athletics	(Italy) 2016 IAAF World Race Walking Team Championships	International	China
7–8	Triathlon	(Mexico) ITU Triathlon World Cup #4	International	Men: (France) Étienne Diemunsch; Women: (Switzerland) Jolanda Annen
7–13	Weightlifting	(Cameroon) 2016 African Weightlifting Championships	Continental	Tunisia
8	Motorcycle racing	(France) 2016 French motorcycle Grand Prix	International	MotoGP: (Spain) Jorge Lorenzo ( (Japan) Movistar Yamaha MotoGP); Moto2: (Spain) Álex Rins ( (Spain) Páginas Amarillas HP 40); Moto3: (South Africa) Brad Binder ( (Finland) Red Bull KTM Ajo)
8	Triathlon	(Italy) ITU Triathlon World Cup #5	International	Men: (Norway) Kristian Blummenfelt; Women: (United Kingdom) India Lee
8	Road running	Wings for Life World Run 2016	International	Men: (Italy) Giorgio Calcaterra; Women: (Japan) Kaori Yoshida
8–14	Futsal	(Costa Rica) 2016 CONCACAF Futsal Championship	Continental	Costa Rica
9–15	Tennis	(Italy) 2016 Italian Open (Rome Masters)	International	Men: (United Kingdom) Andy Murray; Women: (United States) Serena Williams
9–22	Aquatics	(United Kingdom) 2016 European Aquatics Championships	Continental	Swimming: Hungary; Diving: (United Kingdom) Great Britain; Synchronised Swimming: Russia; Overall: (United Kingdom) Great Britain
11–16	Beach volleyball	(Switzerland) 2016 FIVB Beach Volleyball U21 World Championships	International	Men: (Brazil) George Wanderley / Arthur Lanci; Women: (Brazil) Duda Lisboa / Ana Patricia Ramos
12–15	Golf	(United States) 2016 Players Championship	International	(Australia) Jason Day
13–15	Basketball	(Germany) 2016 Euroleague Final Four	Continental	(Russia) CSKA Moscow
13–15	Rugby sevens	(France) 2016 Paris Sevens (WRSS #9)	International	Samoa
13–15	Whitewater slalom	(Slovakia) 2016 European Canoe Slalom Championships	Continental	Slovakia
14	Athletics	(China) Shanghai Golden Grand Prix (DL #2)	International	United States
14	Rugby union	(France) 2016 European Rugby Champions Cup Final	Continental	(England) Saracens
14	Speedway	2016 FIM Warsaw Grand Prix of Poland	International	(United Kingdom) Tai Woffinden
14–15	Triathlon	(Japan) 2016 ITU World Triathlon Series #4	International	Men: (Spain) Mario Mola; Women: (United States) Gwen Jorgensen
15	Formula One	(Spain) 2016 Spanish Grand Prix	International	(Netherlands) Max Verstappen ( (Austria) Red Bull Racing)
15–22	Badminton	(China) 2016 Thomas & Uber Cup	International	Thomas Cup (Men): Denmark; Uber Cup (Women): China
18	Association football	(Switzerland) 2016 UEFA Europa League Final	Continental	(Spain) Sevilla
18–29	Association football	(France) 2016 Toulon Tournament	International	England
19–20	Amateur wrestling	(Iran) 2016 Wrestling World Cup (Men's Greco-Roman)	International	Iran
19–22	Canoe sprint	(United States) 2016 Pan American Canoe Sprint Championships	Continental	Senior: Canada; Junior: Brazil
19–22	Golf	(United States) The Tradition	International	(Germany) Bernhard Langer
19–27	Amateur boxing	(Kazakhstan) 2016 AIBA Women's World Boxing Championships	International	Kazakhstan
21–22	Rugby sevens	(England) 2016 London Sevens (WRSS #10)	International	Scotland
21	Formula E	(Germany) 2016 Berlin ePrix	International	(Switzerland) Sébastien Buemi ( (France) Renault e.Dams)
21	Horse racing	(United States) 2016 Preakness Stakes (US Triple Crown #2)	Domestic	(United States) Exaggerator (Jockey: (United States) Kent Desormeaux)
22	Athletics	(Morocco) Meeting International Mohammed VI d'Athlétisme de Rabat (DL #3)	International	Ethiopia
22	Motorcycle racing	(Italy) 2016 Italian motorcycle Grand Prix	International	MotoGP: (Spain) Jorge Lorenzo ( (Japan) Movistar Yamaha MotoGP); Moto2: (France) Johann Zarco ( (Finland) Ajo Motorsport); Moto3: (South Africa) Brad Binder ( (Finland) Red Bull KTM Ajo)
20-26	Nine-pin bowling	(Croatia) 2016 nine-pin bowling Single's World Championships	International	Single classic: (Serbia) Vilmoš Zavarko (Men), (Croatia) Ines Maričić (Women); Sprint: (Serbia) Vilmoš Zavarko (Men), (Poland) Beata Włodarczyk (Women); Combination: (Serbia) Igor Kovačić (Men), (Croatia) Ines Maričić (Women); Mixed tandem: (Romania) Luminiţa Viorica Dogaru & Nicolae Lupu
22–5 June	Tennis	(France) 2016 French Open (Grand Slam #2)	International	Men: (Serbia) Novak Djokovic; Women: (Spain) Garbiñe Muguruza
23–28	Weightlifting	(Fiji) 2016 Oceania Weightlifting Championships	Continental	Australia
23–29	Archery	(United Kingdom) 2016 European Archery Championships	Continental	Ukraine
23–29	Modern pentathlon	(Russia) 2016 World Modern Pentathlon Championships	International	Hungary
24–28	Squash	(United Arab Emirates) 2016 Men's PSA World Series Finals (United Arab Emirates) 2016 Women's PSA World Series Finals	International	Men: (France) Grégory Gaultier; Women: (England) Laura Massaro
25–29	BMX racing	(Colombia) 2016 UCI BMX World Championships	International	Netherlands
25–29	Artistic gymnastics	(Switzerland) 2016 European Men's Artistic Gymnastics Championships	Continental	Russia
26	Association football	(Italy) 2016 UEFA Women's Champions League Final	Continental	(France) Lyon
26–28	Triathlon	(Portugal) 2016 ETU Triathlon European Championships	Continental	Men: (Spain) Javier Gómez Noya; Women: (United Kingdom) India Lee
26–29	Golf	(United States) Senior PGA Championship	International	(United States) Rocco Mediate
26–29	Golf	(England) 2016 BMW PGA Championship	International	(England) Chris Wood
28	Association football	(Italy) 2016 UEFA Champions League Final	Continental	(Spain) Real Madrid
28	Athletics	(United States) Prefontaine Classic (DL #4)	International	United States
28–29	Athletics	(Austria) 2016 Hypo-Meeting	International	Men: (Canada) Damian Warner; Women: (Canada) Brianne Theisen Eaton
28–11 June	Association football	(Papua New Guinea) 2016 OFC Nations Cup	Continental	New Zealand
29	Formula One	2016 Monaco Grand Prix	International	(United Kingdom) Lewis Hamilton ( (Germany) Mercedes)
29	INDYCAR	(United States) 2016 Indianapolis 500	Domestic	(United States) Alexander Rossi ( (United States) Andretti Herta Autosport)
29	Association football	(Mexico) Liga MX Clausura 2016	National	(Mexico) Pachuca
