= Zane Scotland =

English professional golfer

Personal information
- Full name: Zane Leo Scotland
- Nationality: England
- Born: 17 July 1982 (age 44) Manchester, England
- Height: 6 ft 0 in (1.83 m)

Career
- Sport: Golf
- Turned professional: 2003
- Former tours: European Tour; PGA EuroPro Tour; MENA Tour
- Professional wins: 11

Best results in major championships
- Masters Tournament: DNP
- PGA Championship: DNP
- U.S. Open: DNP
- The Open Championship: T55: 2010

Achievements and awards
- MENA Golf Tour Order of Merit winner: 2013

Zane Leo Scotland (born 17 July 1982) is an English professional golfer.

== Early life and amateur career ==
Scotland was born in Manchester and educated at The John Fisher School in Surrey. In 1997, he won a competition to find a British Tiger Woods. He went on to have a successful amateur career, winning several tournaments and gaining many representative honours, in addition to becoming the youngest English player ever to qualify for The Open Championship in 1999.

== Professional career ==
In 2003, Scotland turned professional. However, a car crash that resulted in an injury to his neck severely affected his early career.

Scotland finally earned his place on the European Tour by finishing inside the top 120 on the Order of Merit in 2007 despite having limited playing opportunities. However he failed to establish himself during his maiden season in 2008 and was back competing on the second tier Challenge Tour the following year. Scotland later played in lower-tier tours including PGA EuroPro Tour and the Dubai-based MENA Golf Tour, winning the MENA Tour's Order of Merit in 2013. Scotland played in the European Tour's Q School in 2013 and made it to the final stage, but finished 57th. Scotland has ten wins on the MENA Tour, the most by any player.

Scotland is the nephew of former Attorney General Baroness Scotland.

In March 2022, Scotland was appointed Diversity Ambassador to The Royal and Ancient Golf Club of St Andrews.

== Amateur wins ==
- 2000 Peter McEvoy Trophy
- 2002 Spanish International Amateur Championship, Portuguese International Amateur Championship

== Professional wins (11) ==
=== PGA EuroPro Tour wins (1) ===
No.	Date	Tournament	Winning score	Margin of victory	Runner-up
1	12 Aug 2010	ABC Solutions UK Championship	−5 (72-71-68=211)	1 stroke	(England) James Busby

=== MENA Golf Tour wins (10) ===
No.	Date	Tournament	Winning score	Margin of victory	Runner(s)-up
1	28 Sep 2011	Abu Dhabi Golf Citizen Open	−8 (69-72-67=208)	1 stroke	(England) Yasin Ali
2	26 Sep 2012	Dubai Creek Open	−8 (65-70-70=205)	2 strokes	(Wales) Stephen Dodd
3	14 Mar 2013	Royal Golf Dar Es Salam Open	−10 (67-73-69=209)	5 strokes	(Morocco) Younes El Hassani
4	25 Sep 2013	Dubai Creek Open (2)	−7 (69-70-67=206)	1 stroke	(New Zealand) Trevor Marshall
5	9 Oct 2013	Shaikh Maktoum Dubai Open	−13 (65-71-67=203)	2 strokes	(Scotland) David Law
6	15 Oct 2013	Ras Al Khaimah Classic	−9 (70-70-67=207)	1 stroke	(Scotland) David Law
7	22 Oct 2014	Ghala Valley	−11 (68-69-68=205)	3 strokes	(Spain) Carlos Balmaseda
8	29 Oct 2014	Golf Citizen Masters	−14 (69-64-66=199)	Playoff	(England) Joshua White
9	25 Mar 2016	Royal Golf Mohammedia Open	−11 (69-68-68=205)	2 strokes	(England) Jamie Elson, (England) Andrew Marshall
10	4 May 2016	Ras Al Khaimah Classic (2)	−10 (67-69-70=206)	Playoff	(England) Craig Hinton, (England) Miles Tunnicliff

== Results in major championships ==
Tournament	1999	2000	2001	2002	2003	2004	2005	2006	2007	2008	2009	2010
The Open Championship	CUT											T55

Did not play

CUT = missed the halfway cut
"T" = tied
Note: Scotland only played in The Open Championship.

== Team appearances ==
Amateur

- European Youths' Team Championship (representing England): 2000 (winners), 2002
- Jacques Léglise Trophy (representing Great Britain & Ireland): 1999 (winners), 2000 (winners)
- St Andrews Trophy (representing Great Britain & Ireland): 2002 (winners)
