= Aaron Leitmannstetter =

German professional golfer

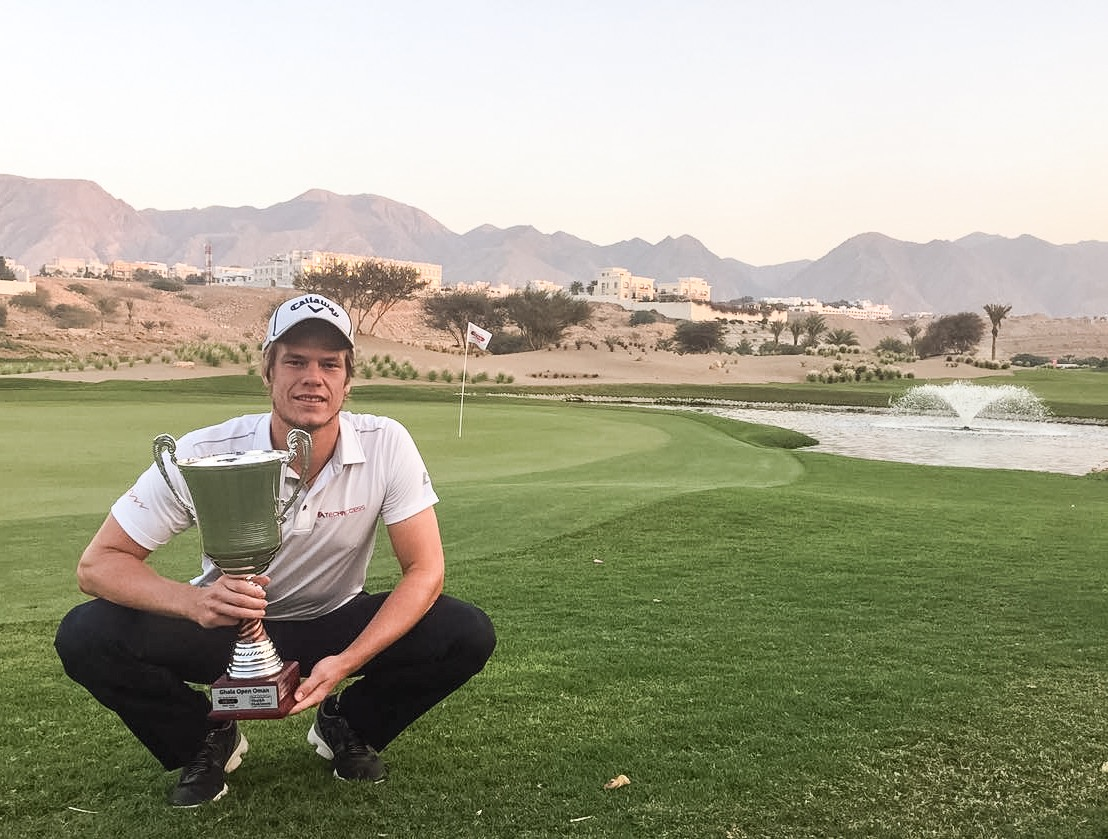

Personal information
- Full name: Aaron Maria Leitmannstetter
- Nationality: Germany
- Born: 5 April 1993 (age 33) Maitenbeth, Germany
- Height: 6 ft 4 in (1.93 m)
- Weight: 94 kg (207 lb; 14.8 st)

Career
- Sport: Golf
- Turned professional: 2013
- Current tour: Challenge Tour
- Former tours: MENA Golf Tour; Pro Golf Tour
- Professional wins: 1

Aaron Maria Leitmannstetter (born 5 April 1993) is a German professional golfer. He played on the European Challenge Tour during 2018.

== Amateur career ==
Leitmannstetter was born and brought up in Maitenbeth, Germany and started playing golf very early. At the age of one and a half, he picked up the club for the first time. He represented the German national team in the years of 2010 and 2011. As an amateur he won the Hellenic Amateur Championship in 2009 and reached the semi-finals of the Boys Amateur Championship in 2010, losing to the eventual winner, Adrián Otaegui.

== Professional career ==
Leitmannstetter professional in 2013. He won the Ghala Open on 2016 MENA Golf Tour with a score of 10 under par.

== Amateur wins ==
- 2009 Hellenic Amateur Championship

== Professional wins (1) ==
=== MENA Golf Tour wins (1) ===
No.	Date	Tournament	Winning score	Margin of victory	Runner-up
1	26 Oct 2016	Ghala Open	−10 (70-70-66=206)	1 stroke	(Morocco) Ahmed Marjan

== Team appearances ==
Amateur

- European Boys Team Championship (representing Germany): 2011
