= 2016 Big Easy Tour =

Golf tour season

2016 Big Easy Tour season
- Duration: 24 May 2016 – 15 September 2016
- Number of official events: 11
- Most wins: (South Africa) Mark Murless (2)
- Order of Merit: (South Africa) Jason Viljoen

The 2016 Big Easy Tour was the sixth season of the Big Easy Tour, the official development tour to the Sunshine Tour.

== Schedule ==
The following table lists official events during the 2016 season.

Date	Tournament	Location	Purse (R)	Winner (Note: The number in brackets after each winner's name is the number of Big Easy Tour events they had won up to and including that tournament. It is rare for someone to accumulate many wins on the Big Easy Tour as success at this level usually leads to promotion to the Sunshine Tour.)	OWGR points	Other tours (Note: MENA − MENA Golf Tour.)
25 May	Observatory GC	Gauteng	100,000	(South Africa) Dylan Naidoo (a) (1)	n/a	
9 Jun	South to East Challenge	Gauteng	US$30,000	(South Africa) Bryandrew Roelofsz (1)	3	MENA
15 Jun	Joburg City Masters	Gauteng	US$30,000	(England) Craig Hinton (n/a)	3	MENA
24 Jun	'The Roar'	Gauteng	US$30,000	(South Africa) Riekus Nortje (4)	3	MENA
29 Jun	Royal J & K	Gauteng	100,000	(South Africa) Sipho Bujela (1)	n/a	
5 Jul	Irene CC	Gauteng	100,000	(South Africa) Aubrey Beckley (a) (1)	n/a	
8 Jul	Huddle Park	Gauteng	100,000	(South Africa) Mark Murless (1)	n/a	
12 Jul	Kempton Park GC	Gauteng	100,000	(South Africa) Pieter Kruger (2)	n/a	
15 Jul	Modderfontein CC	Gauteng	100,000	(South Africa) Daniel Hammond (2)	n/a	
2 Sep	King's Cup	Gauteng	100,000	(South Africa) Mark Murless (2)	n/a	
15 Sep	Big Easy Tour Championship	Gauteng	200,000	(South Africa) Jason Viljoen (1)	n/a	

== Order of Merit ==
The Order of Merit was based on prize money won during the season, calculated in South African rand. The top five players on the Order of Merit earned status to play on the 2017–18 Sunshine Tour.

Position	Player	Prize money (R)
1	(South Africa) Jason Viljoen	75,409
2	(South Africa) Mark Murless	66,762
3	(South Africa) Bryandrew Roelofsz	49,229
4	(South Africa) Riekus Nortje	42,707
5	(South Africa) Pieter Kruger	40,187
