= 2021 Senior Open Championship =

Tournament information
- Dates: 22–25 July 2021
- Location: Sunningdale, England; 51.38°N 0.63°W
- Courses: Sunningdale Golf Club, Old Course
- Organised by: The R&A
- Tours: European Senior Tour; PGA Tour Champions
- Format: 72 holes stroke play

Statistics
- Par: 70
- Length: 6,641 yards (6,073 m)
- Field: 144 players, 79 after cut
- Cut: 145 (+5)
- Prize fund: US$2,500,000
- Winner's share: US$392,800

Champion
- (Wales) Stephen Dodd
- 267 (−13)

Location map
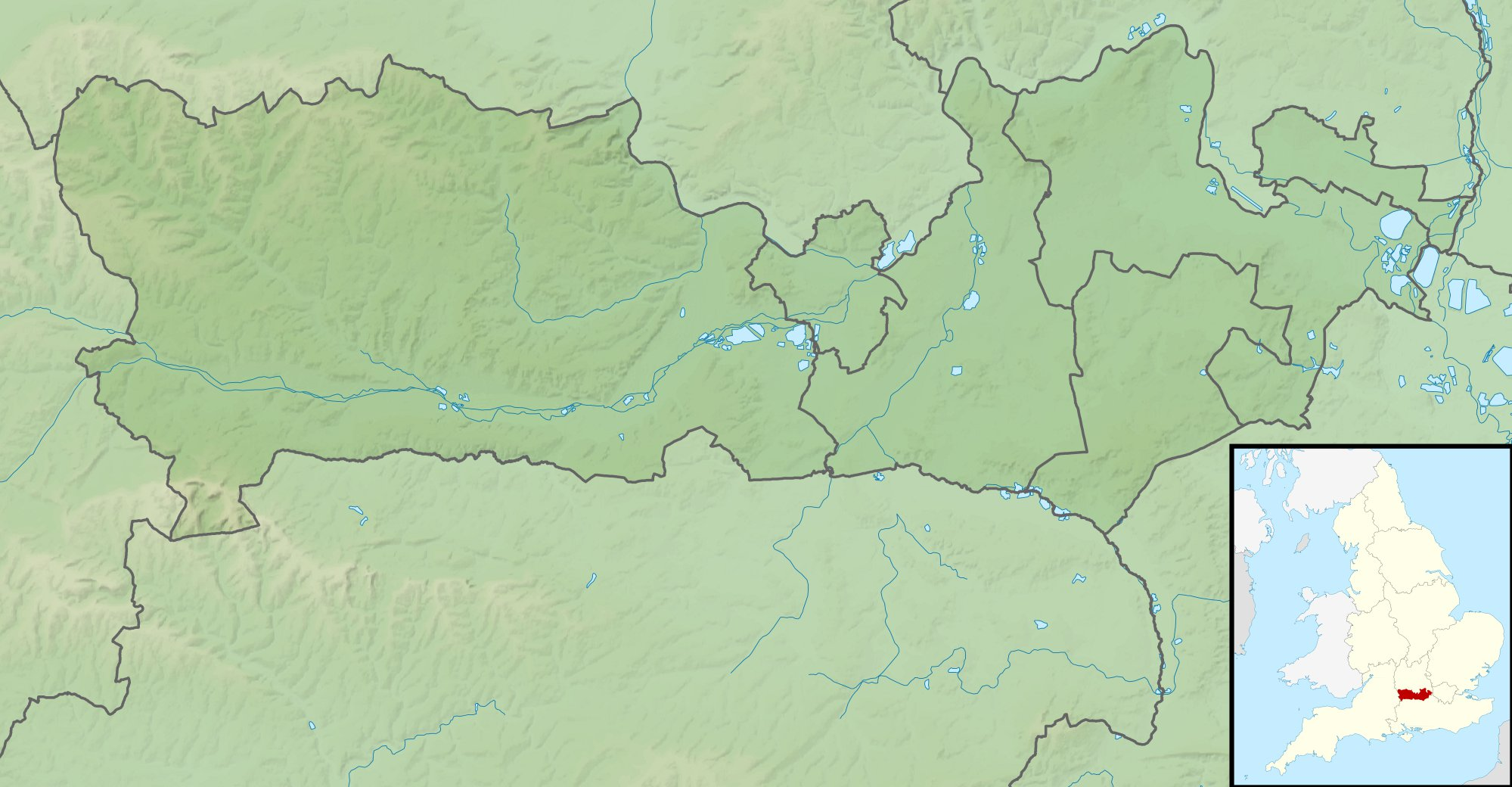
- Location in the United Kingdom Location in England Location in Berkshire

The 2021 Senior Open Championship was a senior major golf championship and the 34th Senior Open Championship, held on 22–25 July at Sunningdale Golf Club in Sunningdale, England. It was the third Senior Open Championship played at the course and the 18th Senior Open Championship played as a senior major championship.

Stephen Dodd won by one stroke over Miguel Ángel Jiménez. It was Dodd's first senior major championship victory.

In 2020, the championship was to take place at Sunningdale Golf Club, but was cancelled due to the COVID-19 pandemic

== Venue ==
The 2021 event was the third Senior Open Championship played at Sunningdale Golf Club. It took place at the clubs Old Course, designed by The Open Championship winner Willie Park Jr. and opened in 1901.

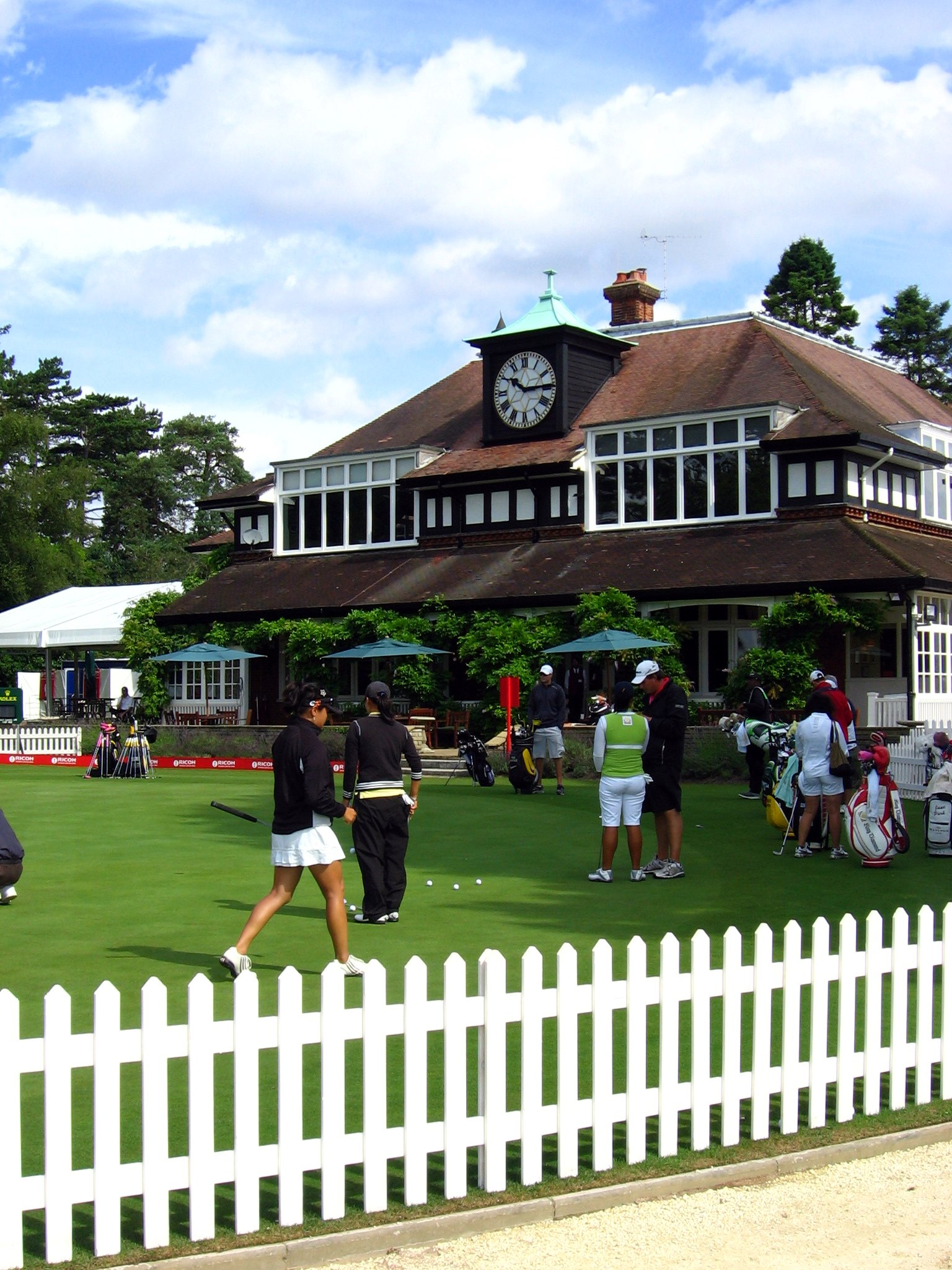
Sunningdale GC clubhouse

=== Course layout ===
Hole	Yards	Par	Hole	Yards	Par
1	492	5	10	488	4
2	489	4	11	322	4
3	318	4	12	442	4
4	156	3	13	180	3
5	419	4	14	503	5
6	433	4	15	245	3
7	406	4	16	434	4
8	193	3	17	425	4
9	273	4	18	423	4
Out	3,179	35	In	3,462	35
Source:		Total		6,641	70

== Field ==
The field consisted of 144 competitors; 133 professionals and 11 amateurs.

An 18-hole stroke play qualifying round was held on Monday, 19 July, for players who were not already exempt. 56 players from the qualifying competition joined the 88 exempt players for the championship.

77 professionals and two amateurs made the 36-hole cut.

=== Past champions in the field ===
Four past Senior British Open champions participated. Three of them made the 36-hole cut; 2018 champion Miguel Ángel Jiménez (2nd), 2010, 2014, 2017 and 2019 champion Bernhard Langer (4th) and 2016 champion Paul Broadhurst (5th). 2011 champion Russ Cochran did not make the cut.

=== Past winners of The Open Championship in the field ===
The field included four former winners of The Open Championship. Three of them made the cut; 2011 Open champion Darren Clarke (3rd), 2002 and 2012 Open champion Ernie Els (tied 8th) and 1996 Open champion Tom Lehman (tied 11th). 1999 Open champion Paul Lawrie missed the cut.

== Final results ==
Sunday, 25 July 2021

Place	Player	Score	To par	Money ($)
1	(Wales) Stephen Dodd	66-71-62-68=267	−13	392,800
2	(Spain) Miguel Ángel Jiménez	69-67-67-65=268	−12	262,000
3	(Northern Ireland) Darren Clarke	65-67-70-67=269	−11	147,400
4	(Germany) Bernhard Langer	66-67-70-68=271	−9	117,800
5	(England) Paul Broadhurst	69-65-69-69=272	−8	99,800
6	(United States) Jerry Kelly	67-66-68-72=273	−7	82,400
7	(Argentina) Ricardo González	66-71-69-69=275	−5	70,600
T8	(South Africa) Ernie Els	67-67-70-72=276	−4	52,900
T8	(United States) Wes Short Jr.	67-70-69-70=276	−4	52,900
T8	(Japan) Yoshinobu Tsukada	71-65-69-71=276	−4	52,900

Preceded by 2021 U.S. Senior Open	Senior Major Championships	Succeeded by 2022 Regions Tradition
