= 2016 MENA Golf Tour =

Golf tour season

2016 MENA Golf Tour season
- Duration: 23 March 2016 – 1 November 2016
- Number of official events: 16
- Most wins: (England) Zane Scotland (2)
- Order of Merit: (England) Craig Hinton

The 2016 MENA Golf Tour was the sixth season of the MENA Golf Tour.

== OWGR inclusion ==
In April, the Official World Golf Ranking announced that all MENA Golf Tour events would be awarded points, beginning with the Ras Al Khaimah Classic.

== Schedule ==
The following table lists official events during the 2016 season.

Date	Tournament	Host country	Purse (US$)	Winner (Note: The number in brackets after each winner's name is the number of MENA Golf Tour events they had won up to and including that tournament.)	OWGR points	Other tours (Note: BET − Big Easy Tour.)
25 Mar	Royal Golf Mohammedia Open	Morocco	50,000	(England) Zane Scotland (9)	n/a	
30 Mar	El Jadida Championship	Morocco	50,000	(England) Andrew Marshall (1)	n/a	
6 Apr	Sotogrande Masters	Spain	50,000	(Scotland) David Law (1)	n/a	
4 May	Ras Al Khaimah Classic	UAE	50,000	(England) Zane Scotland (10)	3	
12 May	Mountain Creek Open	Thailand	30,000	(Venezuela) Wolmer Murillo (1)	3	
19 May	MahaSamutr Masters	Thailand	50,000	(Chile) Antonio Costa (1)	3	
9 Jun	South to East Challenge	South Africa	30,000	(South Africa) Bryandrew Roelofsz (n/a)	3	BET
15 Jun	Joburg City Masters	South Africa	30,000	(England) Craig Hinton (1)	3	BET
24 Jun	'The Roar'	South Africa	30,000	(South Africa) Riekus Nortje (n/a)	3	BET
7 Sep	Dubai Creek Open	UAE	50,000	(India) Rayhan Thomas (a) (1)	3	
14 Sep	Shaikh Maktoum Dubai Open	UAE	50,000	(England) Andrew Marshall (2)	3	
21 Sep	Golf Citizen Classic	UAE	30,000	(Spain) Carlos Balmaseda (1)	3	
28 Sep	Ascorp Golf Citizen Abu Dhabi Open	UAE	50,000	(England) Craig Hinton (2)	3	
19 Oct	Sahara Kuwait Championship	Kuwait	50,000	(England) Joe Heraty (1)	3	
26 Oct	Ghala Open	Oman	50,000	(Germany) Aaron Leitmannstetter (1)	3	
1 Nov	MENA Golf Tour Championship	Oman	100,000	(Republic of Ireland) Tyler Hogarty (1)	3	

== Order of Merit ==
The Order of Merit was based on prize money won during the season, calculated in U.S. dollars. The top three players on the Order of Merit earned status to play on the 2017–18 Sunshine Tour.

Position	Player	Prize money ($)
1	(England) Craig Hinton	39,338
2	(England) Luke Joy	38,355
3	(England) Zane Scotland	34,195
4	(England) Andrew Marshall	29,537
5	(Chile) Antonio Costa	25,392
