= July 2016 in sports =

<<	July 2016					>>
Su	Mo	Tu	We	Th	Fr	Sa
					1	2
3	4	5	6	7	8	9
10	11	12	13	14	15	16
17	18	19	20	21	22	23
24	25	26	27	28	29	30
31
Sports

This list shows notable sports-related events and notable outcomes that occurred in June of 2016.

== Events calendar ==
Date	Sport	Venue/Event	Status	Winner/s
1–10	Road cycling	(Italy) 2016 Giro d'Italia Femminile	International	(United States) Megan Guarnier ( (Netherlands) Boels–Dolmans)
2	Triathlon	(Sweden) 2016 ITU World Triathlon Series #6	International	Men: (United Kingdom) Alistair Brownlee; Women: (Bermuda) Flora Duffy
2–3	Formula E	(United Kingdom) 2016 London ePrix	International	Race 1: (France) Nicolas Prost ( (France) Renault e.dams); Race 2: (France) Nicolas Prost ( (France) Renault e.dams)
2–15	Handball	(Russia) 2016 Women's Junior World Handball Championship	International	Denmark
2–24	Road bicycle racing	2016 Tour de France	International	(United Kingdom) Chris Froome ( (United Kingdom) Team Sky)
3	Formula One	(Austria) 2016 Austrian Grand Prix	International	(United Kingdom) Lewis Hamilton ( (Germany) Mercedes)
4–10	Basketball	(Italy) / (Philippines) / (Serbia) 2016 Men's Olympic Qualifying Tournaments	International	Belgrade: Serbia; Turin: Croatia; Manila: France
4–10	Modern Pentathlon	(Bulgaria) 2016 European Modern Pentathlon Championships	Continental	Czech Republic
4–11	Shooting	(Italy) 2016 European Shotgun Championships	Continental	Italy
8–14	1:8 R/C nitro off-road	(Spain) 2016 EFRA European 1:8 IC Off-Road Championship	Continental	(United Kingdom) Elliott Boots ( (Japan) Kyosho)
6–10	Athletics	(Netherlands) 2016 European Athletics Championships	Continental	Poland
7–10	Golf	(United States) 2016 U.S. Women's Open	International	(United States) Brittany Lang
8–10	BMX racing	(Italy) 2016 European BMX Racing Championships	Continental	Netherlands
8–17	Table tennis	(Croatia) 2016 Table Tennis European Youth Championships	Continental	Russia
9	Speedway	(Wales) 2016 FIM Grand Prix of Great Britain	International	(Sweden) Antonio Lindbäck
9–10	Rowing	(Lithuania) 2016 European Rowing Junior Championships	Continental	Germany
9–10	Triathlon	(Hungary) ITU Triathlon World Cup #6	International	Men: (Russia) Dmitry Polyanski; Women: (United States) Renee Tomlin
9–17	Basketball	(Portugal) 2016 FIBA Europe Under-20 Championship for Women	Continental	Spain
10	Formula One	(United Kingdom) 2016 British Grand Prix	International	(United Kingdom) Lewis Hamilton ( (Germany) Mercedes)
11–24	Association football	(Germany) 2016 UEFA European Under-19 Championship	Continental	France
12	Baseball	(United States) 2016 Major League Baseball All-Star Game	Domestic	American League; MVP: (Florida) Eric Hosmer ( (Missouri) Kansas City Royals); Home Run Derby: (California) Giancarlo Stanton ( (Florida) Miami Marlins)
12–17	Beach handball	(Hungary) 2016 Beach Handball World Championships	International	Men: Croatia; Women: Spain
13–23	Basketball	(Chile) 2016 FIBA Americas Under-18 Championship (Chile) 2016 FIBA Americas Under-18 Championship for Women	International	Men: The United States; Women: The United States
14–17	Athletics	(Georgia (country)) 2016 European Athletics Youth Championships	Continental	(United Kingdom) Great Britain
14–17	Golf	(Scotland) 2016 Open Championship	International	(Sweden) Henrik Stenson
14–17	Whitewater slalom	(Poland) 2016 ICF Junior and U23 Canoe Slalom World Championships	International	Juniors overall: Czech Republic; Under-23 overall: Germany
14–18	Modern pentathlon	(Republic of Ireland) 2016 World Youth A Modern Pentathlon Championships	International	Men: (South Korea) Jeong Youngjin; Women: (Italy) Aurora Tognetti; Men's team and relay: South Korea; Women's team/relay: Russia / Italy; Team-relay mix: Russia
15	Athletics	(Monaco) Herculis (DL #9)	International	Kenya
15–23	Shooting	(Germany) 2016 World Running Target Championships	International	Ukraine
15–24	Softball	(Canada) 2016 Women's Softball World Championship	International	United States
16	Triathlon	(Germany) 2016 ITU World Triathlon Series #7	International	Men: (Spain) Mario Mola; Women: (United States) Katie Zaferes
16–24	Basketball	(Finland) 2016 FIBA Europe Under-20 Championship	Continental	Spain
16–24	Darts	(England) 2016 World Matchplay	International	(Netherlands) Michael van Gerwen
17	Motorcycle racing	(Germany) 2016 German motorcycle Grand Prix	International	MotoGP: (Spain) Marc Márquez ( (Japan) Repsol Honda Team); Moto2: (France) Johann Zarco ( (Finland) Ajo Motorsport); Moto3: (Malaysia) Khairul Idham Pawi ( (Japan) Honda Team Asia)
17	Triathlon	(Germany) 2016 ITU Triathlon Mixed Relay World Championships	International	United States (Gwen Jorgensen / Ben Kanute / Kirsten Kasper/Joe Maloy)
19–24	Athletics	(Poland) 2016 IAAF World U20 Championships	International	United States
19–24	Golf	(United States) 2016 International Crown	International	United States
19–24	Wrestling	(Sweden) 2016 European Cadet Wrestling Championships	Continental	Russia
19–31	Handball	(Slovakia) 2016 Women's Youth World Handball Championship	International	Russia
19–31	Association football	(Slovakia) 2016 UEFA Women's Under-19 Championship	Continental	France
21–24	Golf	(Scotland) Senior Open Championship	International	(England) Paul Broadhurst
22–23	Athletics	(United Kingdom) London Grand Prix (DL #10)	International	United States
22–24	1:10 R/C electric touring car	2016 JMRCA All-Japan 1:10 Scale EP Touring Car Championship	Domestic	Super Expert: (Japan) Souta Goto ( (Japan) Yokomo)
22–13 August	Association football	(Australia) / (China) / (United States) / (European Union) 2016 International Champions Cup	International	Australia: (Italy) Juventus; China: No champion declared due to cancelled match USA/Europe: (France) Paris Saint-Germain
23	Speedway	(Denmark) 2016 Speedway World Cup Event 1	International	Poland (Janowski/Dudek/Pawlicki Jr./Zmarzlik/Pieszczek)
23–24	Triathlon	(Netherlands) 2016 ITU Paratriathlon World Championships	International	United States
24	Formula One	(Hungary) 2016 Hungarian Grand Prix	International	(United Kingdom) Lewis Hamilton ( (Germany) Mercedes)
25–31	1:10 R/C off-road	(Spain) 2016 EFRA European 1:10 Electric Off-Road Championship	Continental	2WD: (United Kingdom) Neil Cragg ( (United States) Team Associated); 4WD: (Germany) Jörn Neumann ( (Netherlands) Serpent)
25–31	Snooker	(China) 2016 World Open	International	(England) Ali Carter
25–31	Tennis	(Canada) 2016 Rogers Cup	International	Men: (Serbia) Novak Djokovic; Women: (Romania) Simona Halep
25–4 August	Pool	(Qatar) 2016 WPA World Nine-ball Championship	International	(Austria) Albin Ouschan
26	Speedway	(Sweden) 2016 Speedway World Cup Event 2	International	Sweden (Lindbäck/Jonsson/Lindgren/Ljung/Andersson)
27–31	Modern pentathlon	(Spain) 2016 European Youth A Modern Pentathlon Championships	Continental	Men: (Belarus) Ivan Khamtsou; Women: (Russia) Xeina Fralcova
28–31	Golf	(United States) 2016 PGA Championship	International	(United States) Jimmy Walker
28–31	Canoe sprint	(Belarus) 2016 ICF Junior and U23 Canoe Sprint World Championships	International	Hungary
28–31	Golf	(England) 2016 Women's British Open	International	(Thailand) Ariya Jutanugarn
29	Speedway	(United Kingdom) 2016 Speedway World Cup Race-off	International	Australia (Holder/Doyle/Masters/Fricke/Kurtz)
29–7 August	Baseball	(Japan) 2016 WBSC 15U Baseball World Cup	International	Cuba
31	Endurance motorcycle racing	(Japan) 2016 Suzuka 8 Hours	International	(Japan) Katsuyuki Nakasuga/ (United Kingdom) Alex Lowes/ (Spain) Pol Espargaro ( (Japan) Yamaha Factory Racing Team)
31	Formula One	(Germany) 2016 German Grand Prix	International	(United Kingdom) Lewis Hamilton ( (Germany) Mercedes)
