= September 2016 in sports =

<<	September 2016					>>
Su	Mo	Tu	We	Th	Fr	Sa
				1	2	3
4	5	6	7	8	9	10
11	12	13	14	15	16	17
18	19	20	21	22	23	24
25	26	27	28	29	30
Sports

This list shows notable sports-related events and notable outcomes that occurred in September of 2016.

== Events calendar ==
Date	Sport	Venue/Event	Status	Winner/s
1	Athletics	(Switzerland) Weltklasse Zürich (DL #13)	International	United States
1–14	Chess	(Azerbaijan) 42nd Chess Olympiad	International	Open: United States (Caruana / Nakamura / So / Shankland / Robson); Women: China (Hou / Ju / Zhao / Tan / Guo)
2–4	3x3 (basketball)	(Romania) 2016 FIBA Europe 3x3 Championships Final Tournament	Continental	Men: Slovenia; Women: Hungary
2–10	Volleyball	(Bulgaria) 2016 Men's U20 Volleyball European Championship	Continental	Poland
2–11	Beach soccer	(Italy) 2016 UEFA Beach Soccer Championship	Continental	Poland
3–4	Triathlon	(Canada) 2016 ITU World Triathlon Series #8	International	Men: (United Kingdom) Jonathan Brownlee; Women: (United States) Summer Cook
3–11	Baseball	(South Korea) 2016 Women's Baseball World Cup	International	Japan
3–17	Association football	(Vanuatu) 2016 OFC U-20 Championship	Continental	New Zealand
3–10 December	American football	(United States) 2016 NCAA Division I FBS season	Domestic	Heisman Trophy: (Florida) Lamar Jackson ( (Kentucky) Louisville Cardinals)
4	Formula One	(Italy) 2016 Italian Grand Prix	International	(Germany) Nico Rosberg ( (Germany) Mercedes)
4	Motorcycle racing	(United Kingdom) 2016 British motorcycle Grand Prix	International	MotoGP: (Spain) Maverick Viñales ( (Japan) Team Suzuki Ecstar); Moto2: (Switzerland) Thomas Lüthi ( (Switzerland) Garage Plus Interwetten); Moto3: (South Africa) Brad Binder ( (Finland) Red Bull KTM Ajo)
5–10	Snooker	(Thailand) 2016 Six-red World Championship	International	(China) Ding Junhui
6–11	Mountain bike racing	(Italy) 2016 UCI Mountain Bike & Trials World Championships (DHI & 4X only)	International	Great Britain
7–18	Multi-sport	(Brazil) 2016 Summer Paralympics	International	China (CHN)
8–1 January 2017	American football	(United States) 2016 NFL season	Domestic	Regular season's AFC winner: (Massachusetts) New England Patriots; Regular season's NFC winner: (Texas) Dallas Cowboys
9	Athletics	(Belgium) Memorial Van Damme (DL #14)	International	United States
9–18	Baseball	(Netherlands) 2016 European Baseball Championship	Continental	Netherlands
10	Speedway	2016 FIM Grand Prix of Germany	International	(Australia) Jason Doyle
10–1 October	Futsal	(Colombia) 2016 FIFA Futsal World Cup	International	Argentina
11	Athletics	(United Kingdom) 2016 Great North Run	International	Men: (United Kingdom) Mo Farah; Women: (Kenya) Vivian Cheruiyot
11	Motorcycle racing	2016 San Marino and Rimini's Coast motorcycle Grand Prix	International	MotoGP: (Spain) Dani Pedrosa ( (Japan) Repsol Honda Team); Moto2: (Italy) Lorenzo Baldassarri ( (Switzerland) Forward Team); Moto3: (South Africa) Brad Binder ( (Finland) Red Bull KTM Ajo)
11–18	Triathlon	(Mexico) 2016 ITU World Triathlon Series Grand Final	International	Men: (South Africa) Henri Schoeman; Women: (Bermuda) Flora Duffy
11–18	Triathlon	(Mexico) 2016 ITU Aquathlon World Championships	International	Men: (United Kingdom) Alistair Brownlee; Women: (Russia) Mariya Shorets
11–24	Association football	(Vietnam) 2016 AFF U-19 Youth Championship	Continental	Australia
13–18	Amateur wrestling	(Georgia (country)) 2016 World Cadet Wrestling Championships	International	Men's Freestyle: Russia; Greco-Roman: Iran; Women's Freestyle: Japan
13–18	Beach volleyball	(Canada) 2016 FIVB Beach Volleyball World Tour Finals	International	Men: (Brazil) Alison Cerutti / Bruno Oscar Schmidt; Women: (Germany) Laura Ludwig / Kira Walkenhorst
13–3 June 2017	Association football	(Europe) 2016-17 UEFA Champions League	Continental	(Spain) Real Madrid
14–18	Climbing	(France) 2016 IFSC Climbing World Championships	International	Japan
14–18	Shooting	(Poland) 2016 World University Shooting Championship	International	India
15–18	Cycling (road)	(France) 2016 European Road Championships	Continental	France
15–18	Golf	(France) 2016 Evian Championship	International	(South Korea) Chun In-gee
15–2 October	Association football	(India) 2016 AFC U-16 Championship	Continental	Iraq
15–24 May 2017	Association football	(Europe) 2016-17 UEFA Europa League	Continental	(England) Manchester United
16–23 April 2017	1:10 R/C off-road racing	(Europe) 2015–16 Euro Offroad Series	Continental	
16–30 July 2017	Endurance motorcycle racing	2016–17 FIM Endurance World Championship	International	
16–18 September	Endurance motorcycle racing	2016 Bol d'Or (EWC #1)	International	(France) Anthony Delhalle/ (France) Vincent Philippe/ (France) Etienne Masson ( (France) Suzuki Endurance Racing Team)
16–18	Canoeing	(Germany) 2016 ICF Canoe Marathon World Championships	International	Hungary
17–18 September	1:8 R/C nitro off-road racing	2016 JMRCA All-Japan 1:8 GP Off-Road Championship	Domestic	(Japan) Naoto Matsukura ( (Japan) Kyosho)
17–1 October	Ice hockey	(Canada) 2016 World Cup of Hockey	International	Canada
18	Basketball	(Germany) 2016 FIBA Intercontinental Cup	International	(Venezuela) Guaros de Lara
18	Formula One	2016 Singapore Grand Prix	International	(Germany) Nico Rosberg ( (Germany) Mercedes)
23–25	Amateur wrestling	(Finland) 2016 World Veteran Wrestling Championships (Greco-Roman only)	International	Russia
24	Speedway	2016 FIM Stockholm Grand Prix of Sweden	International	(Australia) Jason Doyle
24–25	Triathlon	(United States) 2016 ITU Long Distance Triathlon World Championships	International	Men: (France) Sylvain Sudrie; Women: (United Kingdom) Jodie Swallow
24–25	Triathlon	(Ecuador) ITU Triathlon World Cup #8	International	Men: (Spain) David Castro Fajardo; Women: (United States) Kirsten Kasper
24–3 October	Multi-sport	(Vietnam) 2016 Asian Beach Games	Continental	Vietnam
25	Marathon	(Germany) 2016 Berlin Marathon (WMM #4)	International	Men: (Ethiopia) Kenenisa Bekele; Women: (Ethiopia) Aberu Kebede
25	Motorcycle racing	(Spain) 2016 Aragon motorcycle Grand Prix	International	MotoGP: (Spain) Marc Márquez ( (Japan) Repsol Honda Team); Moto2: (United Kingdom) Sam Lowes ( (Italy) Federal Oil Gresini Moto2); Moto3: (Spain) Jorge Navarro ( (Spain) Estrella Galicia 0,0)
30–2 October	Golf	(United States) 2016 Ryder Cup	International	Team USA
30–21 October	Association football	(Jordan) 2016 FIFA U-17 Women's World Cup	International	North Korea
