= 2011 MENA Golf Tour =

Golf tour season

2011 MENA Golf Tour season
- Duration: 26 September 2011 – 19 October 2011
- Number of official events: 4
- Order of Merit: (England) Jake Shepherd

The 2011 MENA Golf Tour was the inaugural season of the MENA Golf Tour.

== Schedule ==
The following table lists official events during the 2011 season.

Date	Tournament	Host country	Purse (US$)	Winner (Note: The number in brackets after each winner's name is the number of MENA Golf Tour events they had won up to and including that tournament.)
28 Sep	Abu Dhabi Golf Citizen Open	UAE	50,000	(England) Zane Scotland (1)
5 Oct	Ras Al Khaimah Classic	UAE	50,000	(England) Ross Canavan (1)
12 Oct	Shaikh Maktoum Dubai Open	UAE	50,000	(England) Peter Richardson (1)
19 Oct	MENA Golf Tour Championship	UAE	75,000	(England) Jake Shepherd (1)

== Order of Merit ==
The Order of Merit was based on prize money won during the season, calculated in U.S. dollars.

Position	Player	Prize money ($)
1	(England) Jake Shepherd	17,749
2	(England) Peter Richardson	15,087
3	(United States) Sean McNamara	13,271
4	(England) Ross Canavan	13,159
5	(England) Zane Scotland	11,148
