= April 2016 in sports =

<<	April 2016					>>
Su	Mo	Tu	We	Th	Fr	Sa
					1	2
3	4	5	6	7	8	9
10	11	12	13	14	15	16
17	18	19	20	21	22	23
24	25	26	27	28	29	30
Sports

This list shows notable sports-related events and notable outcomes that occurred in April of 2016.

== Events calendar ==
Date	Sport	Venue/Event	Status	Winner/s
3	Pro Wrestling	(United States) WWE WrestleMania 32	National	(Main Event) Roman Reigns vs Triple H, Roman Won
1–3	Acrobatic Gymnastics	(China) 2016 Acrobatic Gymnastics World Championships	International	Russia
1–4	Canoe sprint	(South Africa) 2016 Canoe Sprint African Championships	Continental	South Africa
2	Formula E	(United States) 2016 Long Beach ePrix	International	(Brazil) Lucas di Grassi ( (Germany) ABT Schaeffler Audi Sport)
2–8	Ice hockey	(Slovenia) 2016 IIHF Women's World Championship Division II – Group A	International	Poland was promoted to Division I – Group B Croatia was relegated to Division II – Group B
2–10	Curling	(Switzerland) 2016 World Men's Curling Championship	International	Canada (Skip: Kevin Koe)
3	Triathlon	(New Zealand) ITU Triathlon World Cup #2	International	Men: (South Africa) Richard Murray; Women: (United States) Gwen Jorgensen
3	Formula One	2016 Bahrain Grand Prix	International	(Germany) Nico Rosberg ( (Germany) Mercedes)
3	Motorcycle racing	(Argentina) 2016 Argentine motorcycle Grand Prix	International	MotoGP: (Spain) Marc Márquez ( (Japan) Repsol Honda Team); Moto2: (France) Johann Zarco ( (Finland) Ajo Motorsport); Moto3: (Malaysia) Khairul Idham Pawi ( (Japan) Honda Team Asia)
3–2 October	Baseball	(United States) / (Canada) 2016 Major League Baseball season	Domestic	American League: Texas Rangers; National League: (Illinois) Chicago Cubs
3–25 November	WTCC	(Europe) / (Morocco) / (Argentina) / (Japan) / (China) / (Thailand) / (Qatar) 2016 World Touring Car Championship	International	(Argentina) José María López ( (France) Citroën World Touring Car Team)
7 October 2015–10	Ice hockey	(United States) / (Canada) 2015-16 NHL season	Domestic	Presidents' Trophy: (Washington, D.C.) Washington Capitals
4–10	Ice hockey	(Romania) 2016 IIHF World U18 Championships Division II – Group A	International	Poland was promoted to Division I – Group B The Netherlands was relegated to Division II – Group B
4–10	Ice hockey	(Italy) 2016 IIHF Women's World Championship Division I – Group B	International	Hungary was promoted to Division I – Group A The Netherlands was relegated to Division II – Group A
7–10	Golf	(United States) 2016 Masters Tournament	International	(England) Danny Willett
8–10	Rugby sevens	2016 Hong Kong Sevens (WRSS #7)	International	Fiji
9	Horse racing	(England) 2016 Grand National	International	(United Kingdom) Rule The World (Jockey: (Republic of Ireland) David Mullins)
9–10	Triathlon	(Australia) 2016 ITU World Triathlon Series #2	International	Men: (Spain) Mario Mola; Women: (United Kingdom) Helen Jenkins
9–15	Ice hockey	(Spain) 2016 IIHF World Championship Division II – Group A	International	The Netherlands was promoted to Division I – Group B China was relegated to Division II – Group B
9–15	Ice hockey	(Belarus) 2016 IIHF World U18 Championship Division I – Group A	International	Belarus was promoted to Top Division; Austria was relegated to Division I – Group B
10	Motorcycle racing	(United States) 2016 Motorcycle Grand Prix of the Americas	International	MotoGP: (Spain) Marc Márquez ( (Japan) Repsol Honda Team); Moto2: (Spain) Álex Rins ( (Spain) Páginas Amarillas HP 40); Moto3: (Italy) Romano Fenati ( (Italy) Sky Racing Team VR46)
10–16	Ice hockey	(Mexico) 2016 IIHF World Championship Division II – Group B	International	Australia was promoted to Division II – Group A Bulgaria was relegated to Division III
10–16	Weightlifting	(Norway) 2016 European Weightlifting Championships	Continental	Men: Turkey; Women: Armenia; Overall: Armenia
10–17	Tennis	(Monaco) 2016 Monte Carlo Masters	International	(Spain) Rafael Nadal
27 October 2015–13	Basketball	(United States) / (Canada) 2015–16 NBA season	Domestic	Top regular season team: (California) Golden State Warriors; Season MVP: (Ohio) Stephen Curry ( (California) Golden State Warriors)
13–18	Fencing	(China) 2016 Asian Fencing Championships	Continental	South Korea
13–12 June	Ice hockey	(United States) 2016 Stanley Cup playoffs	Domestic	(Pennsylvania) Pittsburgh Penguins; Conn Smythe Trophy Winner: (Nova Scotia) Sidney Crosby (Pittsburgh Penguins)
14	Basketball	(United States) 2016 WNBA draft	Domestic	#1 pick: (New York (state)) Breanna Stewart from the University of Connecticut to the (Washington (state)) Seattle Storm
14–24	Ice hockey	(United States) 2016 IIHF World U18 Championships	International	Finland
15–24	Futsal	(South Africa) 2016 Africa Futsal Cup of Nations	Continental	Morocco
16	Triathlon	(China) ITU Triathlon World Cup #3	International	Men: (Mexico) Rodrigo González; Women: (United States) Summer Cook
16–17	Rugby sevens	2016 Singapore Sevens (WRSS #8)	International	Kenya
16–23	Curling	(Sweden) 2016 World Senior Curling Championships	International	Men: Sweden (Skip: Mats Wranå); Women: Scotland (Skip: Jackie Lockhart)
16–23	Curling	(Sweden) 2016 World Mixed Doubles Curling Championship	International	Russia (Alexander Krushelnitskiy & Anastasia Bryzgalova)
16–24	Croquet	(United States) 2016 AC World Championship	International	(England) Stephen Mulliner
16–2 May	Snooker	(England) 2016 World Snooker Championship	International	(England) Mark Selby
16–19 June	Basketball	(United States) 2016 NBA Playoffs	Domestic	(Ohio) Cleveland Cavaliers; MVP: (Ohio) LeBron James (Cleveland Cavaliers)
17	Formula One	(China) 2016 Chinese Grand Prix	International	(Germany) Nico Rosberg ( (Germany) Mercedes)
17–23	Ice hockey	(Croatia) 2016 IIHF World Championship Division I – Group B	International	Ukraine was promoted to Division I – Group A Romania was relegated to Division II – Group A
18	Association football	(Switzerland) 2015–16 UEFA Youth League Final	Continental	(England) Chelsea
18	Marathon	(United States) 2016 Boston Marathon (WMM #2)	International	Men: (Ethiopia) Berhanu Lemi; Women: (Ethiopia) Atsede Baysa
18–24	Ice hockey	(Italy) 2016 IIHF World U18 Championships Division I – Group B	International	Hungary was promoted to Division I – Group A South Korea was relegated to Division II – Group A
20–27	Association football	(Mexico) 2016 CONCACAF Champions League Finals	Continental	(Mexico) Club América
21–24	Judo	(Russia) 2016 European Judo Championships	Continental	Men: Georgia; Women: France; Overall: France
23	Association football	(New Zealand) 2016 OFC Champions League Final	Continental	(New Zealand) Auckland City
23	Formula E	(France) 2016 Paris ePrix	International	(Brazil) Lucas di Grassi ( (Germany) ABT Schaeffler Audi Sport)
23–24	Triathlon	(South Africa) 2016 ITU World Triathlon Series #3	International	Men: (Spain) Fernando Alarza; Women: (United Kingdom) Non Stanford
23–24	Whitewater slalom	(Japan) 2016 Asian Canoe Slalom Championships	Continental	China
23–29	Ice hockey	(Poland) 2016 IIHF World Championship Division I – Group A	International	Slovenia was promoted to Top Division; Japan was relegated to Division I – Group B
23–30	Squash	(Malaysia) 2015 Women's World Open Squash Championship	International	(Egypt) Nour El Sherbini
24	Marathon	(United Kingdom) 2016 London Marathon (WMM #3)	International	Men: (Kenya) Eliud Kipchoge; Women: (Kenya) Jemima Sumgong
24	Motorcycle racing	(Spain) 2016 Spanish motorcycle Grand Prix	International	MotoGP: (Italy) Valentino Rossi ( (Japan) Movistar Yamaha MotoGP); Moto2: (United Kingdom) Sam Lowes ( (Italy) Federal Oil Gresini Moto2); Moto3: (South Africa) Brad Binder ( (Finland) Red Bull KTM Ajo)
24–29	Squash	(Egypt) El Gouna International 2016 (PSA WS #7)	International	(Egypt) Mohamed El Shorbagy
25–27	Fencing	(Brazil) 2016 World Fencing Championships	International	Men's team sabre: Russia; Women's team foil: Russia
25–30	Weightlifting	(Uzbekistan) 2016 Asian Weightlifting Championships	Continental	Men's: China; Women's: China; Overall: China
26–1 May	Badminton	(China) 2016 Badminton Asia Championships	Continental	Men's: (Malaysia) Lee Chong Wei; Women's: (China) Wang Yihan; Men's doubles: (South Korea) Lee Yong-dae/Yoo Yeon-seong; Women's doubles: (Japan) Misaki Matsutomo/Ayaka Takahashi; Mixed doubles: (China) Zhang Nan/Zhao Yunlei
26–1 May	Badminton	(France) 2016 European Badminton Championships	Continental	Men's: (Denmark) Viktor Axelsen; Women's: (Spain) Carolina Marín; Men's doubles: (Denmark) Mads Conrad-Petersen/Mads Pieler Kolding; Women's doubles: (Denmark) Christinna Pedersen/Kamilla Rytter Juhl; Mixed doubles: (Denmark) Joachim Fischer Nielsen/Christinna Pedersen
28–30	American football	(United States) 2016 NFL Draft	Domestic	#1 pick: Jared Goff from the University of California, Berkeley to the Los Angeles Rams
28–30	Judo	(Cuba) 2016 Pan American Judo Championships	Continental	Brazil
28–30	Table tennis	(United Arab Emirates) 2016 Asian Cup Table Tennis Tournament	Continental	Men: (China) Xu Xin; Women: (China) Liu Shiwen
28–1 May	Triathlon	(Japan) 2016 ASTC Triathlon Asian Championships	Continental	Men: (Japan) Hirokatsu Tayama; Women: (Japan) Ai Ueda
30	Speedway	2016 FIM Grand Prix of Slovenia	International	(Denmark) Peter Kildemand
