= Stephen Dodd =

Welsh professional golfer (born 1966)

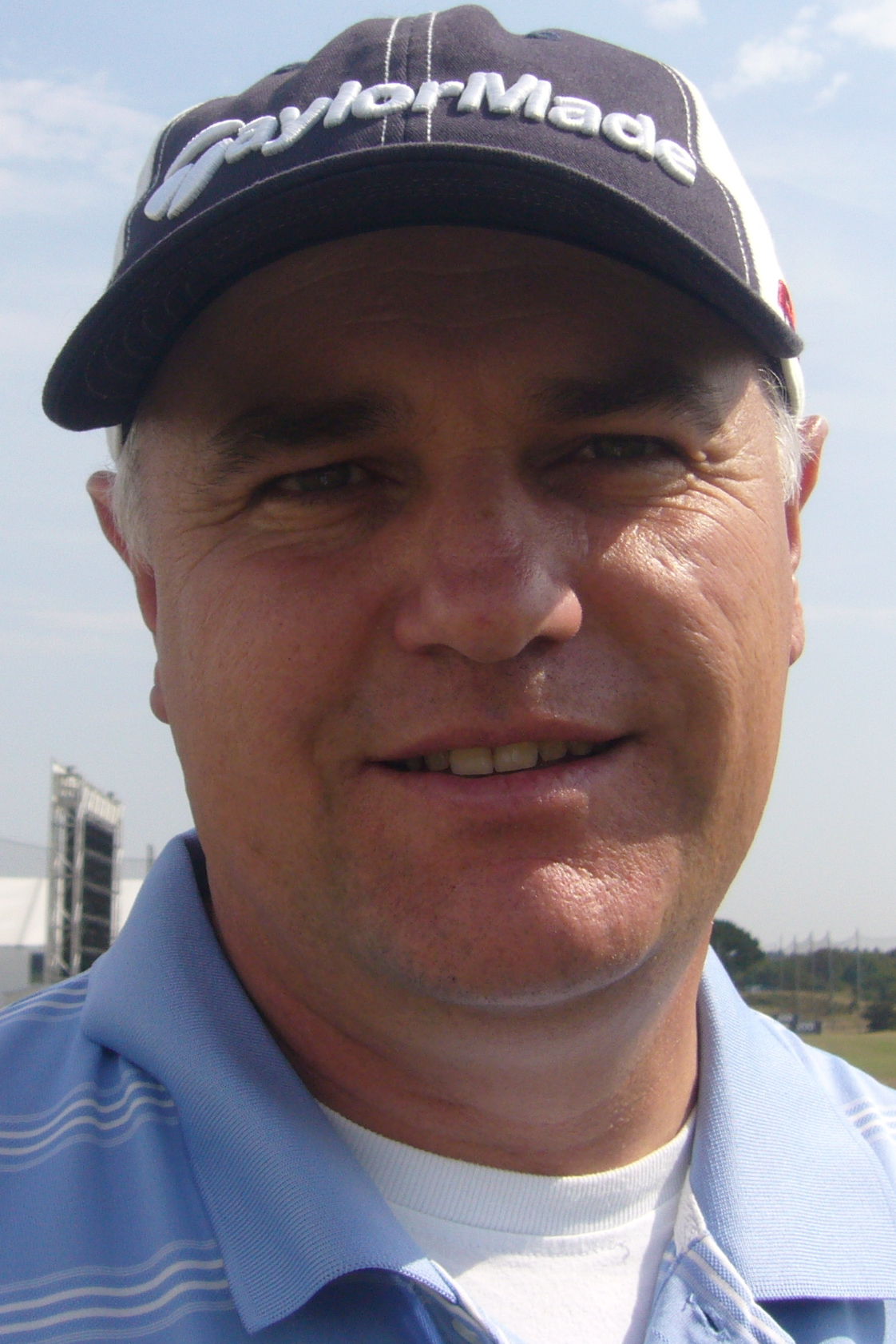
- Dodd in 2009

Personal information
- Full name: Stephen Christopher Dodd
- Nationality: Wales
- Born: 15 July 1966 (age 60) Cardiff, Wales
- Height: 5 ft 11 in (1.80 m)
- Weight: 187 lb (85 kg; 13.4 st)

Career
- Sport: Golf
- Turned professional: 1990
- Current tours: European Senior Tour; PGA Tour Champions
- Former tours: European Tour; Challenge Tour; PGA EuroPro Tour; MENA Tour
- Professional wins: 19
- Highest ranking: 56 (22 May 2005)

Number of wins by tour
- European Tour: 3
- Asian Tour: 1
- Challenge Tour: 1
- PGA Tour Champions: 1
- European Senior Tour: 4
- Other: 11

Best results in major championships
- Masters Tournament: CUT: 1990
- PGA Championship: CUT: 2005, 2006
- U.S. Open: DNP
- The Open Championship: CUT: 1989, 2005, 2006, 2022

Achievements and awards
- MENA Golf Tour Order of Merit winner: 2012
- European Senior Tour Order of Merit winner: 2021

Stephen Christopher Dodd (born 15 July 1966) is a Welsh professional golfer who won the 2021 Senior Open Championship. On the regular tours, he won three events on the European Tour 2005−2006. He also won the 2005 WGC-World Cup for Wales in partnership with Bradley Dredge.

== Early life and amateur career ==
Dodd was born in Cardiff. He had a successful amateur career highlighted by victory in The Amateur Championship at Royal Birkdale in 1989, which qualified him to play in The Open Championship that year and the Masters Tournament the following year. He played in the 1989 Walker Cup, being part of the first Great Britain and Ireland team to win in the United States. He was named BBC Wales Sports Personality of the Year in 1989.

== Professional career ==
Dodd turned professional in 1990. He spent the early years of his professional career on Europe's second tier Challenge Tour. In 1992 he won the Bank Austria Open on that tour, but his results were generally patchy. He first gained his place on the main European Tour in 1995, but found himself returning to qualifying school every year until 2001, when he finally broke into the top 100 on the Order of Merit to automatically retain his playing status. He then steadily improved, having new personal best seasons in 2003 and 2004, finishing 80th and 58th respectively on the money list.

The 2005 season marked a sudden improvement in Dodd's fortunes. He won the first tournament he entered that season, the Volvo China Open (actually played in late 2004), which was one of several events co-sanctioned by the European Tour and the Asian Tour. A few weeks later he picked up a new biggest paycheck of his career by coming tied second in the higher profile Dubai Desert Classic. He went on to win the Nissan Irish Open in May, and in November he won the WGC-World Cup for Wales in partnership with Bradley Dredge. He finished the season ranked a career high 17th on the Order of Merit.

In 2006 Dodd won the Smurfit European Open, granting him a five-year exemption on the European Tour. He finished the season ranked 29th on the Order of Merit. Since then his form has dropped, and in 2008 he made just 4 cuts as he slipped to 245th on the end of season money list. His career started to decline and by 2012, he was playing on the third-tier Dubai-based MENA Golf Tour, where he had three wins. In 2016 he won the GRENKE Championship on the PGA EuroPro Tour, a few weeks before his 50th birthday.

Dodd joined the European Senior Tour after turning 50. In his first season, 2016, he won the Senior Italian Open and followed up with wins in the 2017 Farmfoods European Senior Masters and the 2018 WINSTONgolf Senior Open.

Dodd's biggest success of his career came at the 2021 Senior Open Championship. He shot an 8-under-par 62 in the third round to take a two shot lead going into the final round. A 68 on the final day was good enough to see off Miguel Ángel Jiménez by one shot. The win also gave him an exemption into the 2022 Open Championship.

== Personal life ==
Dodd lives in Barry, Wales with his wife Allison and their son Liam.

== Awards and honors ==
- In 1989, Dodd was named BBC Wales Sports Personality of the Year
- In 2012, he earned the Order of Merit title for the MENA Golf Tour
- In 2021, Dodd earned the Order of Merit title for the European Senior Tour

== Amateur wins ==
- 1989 The Amateur Championship, Welsh Amateur Championship, Welsh Amateur Open Stroke Play Championship

== Professional wins (19) ==
=== European Tour wins (3) ===
No.	Date	Tournament	Winning score	Margin of victory	Runner(s)-up
1	28 Nov 2004 (2005 season)	Volvo China Open^{1}	−12 (68-70-70-68=276)	3 strokes	(Denmark) Thomas Bjørn
2	22 May 2005	Nissan Irish Open	−9 (69-70-72-68=279)	Playoff	(England) David Howell
3	9 Jul 2006	Smurfit Kappa European Open	−9 (67-69-73-70=279)	2 strokes	(Spain) José Manuel Lara, (England) Anthony Wall

^{1}Co-sanctioned by the Asian Tour

European Tour playoff record (1–0)

No.	Year	Tournament	Opponent	Result
1	2005	Nissan Irish Open	(England) David Howell	Won with birdie on first extra hole

=== Challenge Tour wins (1) ===
No.	Date	Tournament	Winning score	Margin of victory	Runner-up
1	5 Jul 1992	Bank Austria Open	−11 (69-67-71-70=277)	3 strokes	(Scotland) Gordon Manson

Challenge Tour playoff record (0–1)

No.	Year	Tournament	Opponent	Result
1	1992	Memorial Olivier Barras	(England) Jeff Hall	Lost to birdie on second extra hole

=== PGA EuroPro Tour wins (1) ===
No.	Date	Tournament	Winning score	Margin of victory	Runner-up
1	24 Jun 2016	Grenke Championship	−13 (66-66-68=200)	Playoff	(England) Adam Hodkinson

=== MENA Golf Tour wins (3) ===
No.	Date	Tournament	Winning score	Margin of victory	Runners-up
1	24 Oct 2012	Shaikh Maktoum Dubai Open	−11 (68-68-69=205)	2 strokes	(England) Martin LeMesurier, (England) Zane Scotland
2	21 Mar 2013	Royal D'Anfa Open	−6 (70-69-71=210)	Playoff	(England) Ian Keenan, (England) Zane Scotland
3	23 Oct 2013	Abu Dhabi Golf Citizen Open	−6 (72-68-70=210)	1 stroke	(England) Stuart Archibald, (England) Craig Hinton

=== Other wins (7) ===
- 1991 Memorial Olivier Barras
- 1995 Welsh PGA Championship
- 2001 Welsh PGA Championship
- 2005 WGC-World Cup (with Bradley Dredge)
- 2007 Ryder Cup Wales Welsh PGA Championship
- 2011 Welsh National PGA Championship
- 2014 Welsh National PGA Championship

=== PGA Tour Champions wins (1) ===
Legend
Senior major championships (1)
Other PGA Tour Champions (0)

No.	Date	Tournament	Winning score	Margin of victory	Runner-up
1	25 Jul 2021	The Senior Open Championship	−13 (66-71-62-68=267)	1 stroke	(Spain) Miguel Ángel Jiménez

=== European Senior Tour wins (4) ===
Legend
Senior major championships (1)
Other European Senior Tour (3)

No.	Date	Tournament	Winning score	Margin of victory	Runner(s)-up
1	23 Oct 2016	Senior Italian Open	−9 (69-64-71=204)	1 stroke	(Wales) Phillip Price
2	22 Oct 2017	Farmfoods European Senior Masters	−2 (71-73-70=214)	1 stroke	(United States) Clark Dennis, (Republic of Ireland) Paul McGinley
3	15 Jul 2018	WINSTONgolf Senior Open	−15 (64-66-71=201)	6 strokes	(France) Jean-François Remésy
4	25 Jul 2021	The Senior Open Championship	−13 (66-71-62-68=267)	1 stroke	(Spain) Miguel Ángel Jiménez

== Results in major championships ==
Results not in chronological order in 2020.

Tournament	1989	1990	1991	1992	1993	1994	1995	1996	1997	1998	1999
Masters Tournament		CUT									
The Open Championship	CUT										
PGA Championship											

Tournament	2000	2001	2002	2003	2004	2005	2006	2007	2008	2009
Masters Tournament										
The Open Championship						CUT	CUT			
PGA Championship						CUT	CUT			

Tournament	2010	2011	2012	2013	2014	2015	2016	2017	2018
Masters Tournament									
The Open Championship									
PGA Championship									

Tournament	2019	2020	2021	2022
Masters Tournament				
PGA Championship				
The Open Championship		NT		CUT

Did not play

CUT = missed the half-way cut
NT = No tournament due to the COVID-19 pandemic
Note: Dodd never played in the U.S. Open.

== Results in World Golf Championships ==
Tournament	2005	2006
Match Play		
Championship	T18	
Invitational	69	T50

Did not play

"T" = Tied

== Senior major championships ==
=== Wins (1) ===
Year	Championship	54 holes	Winning score	Margin	Runner-up
2021	The Senior Open Championship	2 shot lead	−13 (66-71-62-68=267)	1 stroke	(Spain) Miguel Ángel Jiménez

=== Results timeline ===
Results not in chronological order.

Tournament	2016	2017	2018	2019	2020	2021	2022	2023	2024	2025	2026
Senior PGA Championship		CUT	T56	CUT	NT		T70	CUT		WD	
The Tradition					NT		T68		T75	73	T63
U.S. Senior Open	CUT			CUT	NT		CUT		CUT		CUT
Senior Players Championship								T25	66	77	T53
The Senior Open Championship	T14	T61	T18	T18	NT	1	T47	CUT	T64	CUT	CUT

Win
Did not play

CUT = missed the halfway cut
WD = withdrw
"T" indicates a tie for a place
NT = no tournament due to COVID-19 pandemic

== Team appearances ==
Amateur

- Walker Cup (representing Great Britain & Ireland): 1989 (winners)
- European Amateur Team Championship (representing Wales): 1987, 1989

Professional

- Seve Trophy (representing Great Britain & Ireland): 2005 (winners)
- World Cup (representing Wales): 2005 (winners), 2006, 2007, 2009
