= June 2016 in sports =

| << | June 2016 | | | | | >> |
| Su | Mo | Tu | We | Th | Fr | Sa |
| | | | 1 | 2 | 3 | 4 |
| 5 | 6 | 7 | 8 | 9 | 10 | 11 |
| 12 | 13 | 14 | 15 | 16 | 17 | 18 |
| 19 | 20 | 21 | 22 | 23 | 24 | 25 |
| 26 | 27 | 28 | 29 | 30 |
Sports

This list shows notable sports-related events and notable outcomes that occurred in June of 2016.

== Events calendar ==
| Date | Sport | Venue/Event | Status | Winner/s |
|---|---|---|---|---|
| 1–5 | Artistic gymnastics | (Switzerland) 2016 European Women's Artistic Gymnastics Championships | Continental | Russia |
| 2 | Athletics | (Italy) Golden Gala (DL #5) | International | South Africa |
| 2–5 | Darts | (Germany) 2016 PDC World Cup of Darts | International | England (Phil Taylor & Adrian Lewis) |
| 3–26 | Association football | (United States) Copa América Centenario | Continental | Chile |
| 3–10 July | Volleyball | (Thailand) 2016 FIVB Volleyball World Grand Prix | International | Brazil |
| 4 | Horse racing | (England) 2016 Epsom Derby | International | (Republic of Ireland) Harzand (Jockey: (Republic of Ireland) Pat Smullen) |
| 4 | Triathlon | (Spain) 2016 ITU Duathlon World Championships | International | Men: (South Africa) Richard Murray; Women: (United Kingdom) Emma Pallant |
| 4–11 | Weightlifting | (Colombia) 2016 Pan American Weightlifting Championships | Continental | Colombia |
| 5 | Athletics | (United Kingdom) British Grand Prix (DL #6) | International | United States |
| 5 | Motorcycle racing | (Spain) 2016 Catalan motorcycle Grand Prix | International | MotoGP: (Italy) Valentino Rossi ( (Japan) Movistar Yamaha MotoGP); Moto2: (France) Johann Zarco ( (Finland) Ajo Motorsport); Moto3: (Spain) Jorge Navarro ( (Spain) Estrella Galicia 0,0) |
| 7–12 | Water polo | (China) 2016 FINA Women's Water Polo World League Superfinal | International | United States |
| 7–25 | Rugby union | (England) 2016 World Rugby U20 Championship | International | England |
| 9 | Athletics | (Norway) Bislett Games (DL #7) | International | Kenya |
| 9–12 | Golf | (United States) 2016 KPMG Women's PGA Championship | International | (Canada) Brooke Henderson |
| 9–12 | Golf | (United States) Senior Players Championship | International | (Germany) Bernhard Langer |
| 9–12 | Radio-controlled racing | (United States) 2016 ROAR 1:8 Fuel Off-Road National Championship | Domestic | (United States) Spencer Rivkin ( (United States) Team Associated) |
| 10–16 | Paralympic athletics | (Italy) 2016 IPC Athletics European Championships | Continental | Russia |
| 10–17 | Field hockey | (United Kingdom) 2016 Men's Hockey Champions Trophy | International | Australia |
| 10–10 July | Association football | (France) UEFA Euro 2016 | Continental | Portugal |
| 11 | Horse racing | (United States) 2016 Belmont Stakes (US Triple Crown #3) | Domestic | (United States) Creator (Jockey: (Puerto Rico) Irad Ortiz, Jr.) |
| 11 | Speedway | 2016 FIM Grand Prix of Denmark | International | (Poland) Maciej Janowski |
| 11–12 | Amateur wrestling | (United States) 2016 Wrestling World Cup (Men's Freestyle) | International | Iran |
| 11–12 | Triathlon | (United Kingdom) 2016 ITU World Triathlon Series #5 | International | Men: (United Kingdom) Alistair Brownlee; Women: (United States) Gwen Jorgensen |
| 11–19 | Handball | (Argentina) 2016 Pan American Men's Handball Championship | Continental | Brazil |
| 12 | Formula One | (Canada) 2016 Canadian Grand Prix | International | (United Kingdom) Lewis Hamilton ( (Germany) Mercedes) |
| 13–19 | Shooting | (Estonia) 2016 European Junior Shooting Championships | Continental | Germany |
| 14–18 | Horse racing | (England) Royal Ascot 2016 | International | |
| 16 | Athletics | (Sweden) Stockholm Bauhaus Athletics (DL #8) | International | United States |
| 16–19 | Golf | (United States) 2016 U.S. Open | International | (United States) Dustin Johnson |
| 16–17 July | Volleyball | (Poland) 2016 FIVB Volleyball World League | International | Serbia |
| 17–19 | Rhythmic gymnastics | (Israel) 2016 Rhythmic Gymnastics European Championships | Continental | Russia |
| 17–19 | Sport aerobics | (South Korea) 2016 Aerobic Gymnastics World Championships | International | China |
| 18–19 | Rugby sevens | (Monaco) 2016 Men's Olympic Qualification Tournament | International | Spain |
| 18–19 | Sportscar racing | (France) 2016 24 Hours of Le Mans | International | (Germany) Marc Lieb / (France) Romain Dumas / (Switzerland) Neel Jani ( (Germany) Porsche Team) |
| 18–26 | Field hockey | (United Kingdom) 2016 Women's Hockey Champions Trophy | International | Argentina |
| 19 | Formula One | (Azerbaijan) 2016 European Grand Prix | International | (Germany) Nico Rosberg ( (Germany) Mercedes) |
| 19–25 | Ultimate Frisbee | (United Kingdom) 2016 World Ultimate and GUTS Championships | International | |
| 20–25 | Fencing | (Poland) 2016 European Fencing Championships | Continental | Russia |
| 21–26 | Amateur wrestling | (Romania) 2016 European Junior Wrestling Championships | Continental | Men's Freestyle: Russia; Women's Freestyle: Russia; Greco-Roman: Georgia |
| 22–26 | Athletics | (South Africa) 2016 African Championships in Athletics | Continental | South Africa |
| 22–3 July | Basketball | (Spain) 2016 FIBA Under-17 World Championship (Spain) 2016 FIBA Under-17 World Championship for Women | International | Men: United States; Women: Australia |
| 23 | Basketball | (United States) 2016 NBA draft | International | #1 pick: (Australia) Ben Simmons to the (Pennsylvania) Philadelphia 76ers from (Louisiana) LSU |
| 24–25 | Ice hockey | (United States) 2016 NHL entry draft | International | #1 pick: (United States) Auston Matthews to the (Canada) Toronto Maple Leafs from (Switzerland) ZSC Lions |
| 24–26 | Canoe sprint | (Russia) 2016 Canoe Sprint European Championships | Continental | Hungary |
| 22–24 | Radio-controlled racing | 2016 JMRCA All-Japan 1:12 EP Racing Championship | Domestic | (Japan) Hayato Ishioka ( (United States) CRC) |
| 25 | Speedway | 2016 FIM Grand Prix of Czech Republic | International | (Australia) Jason Doyle |
| 25–26 | Mountain bike racing | (France) 2016 UCI Mountain Bike Marathon World Championships | International | Men: (Portugal) Tiago Ferreira; Women: (Switzerland) Jolanda Neff |
| 25–26 | Rugby sevens | (Republic of Ireland) 2016 Women's Olympic Qualification Tournament | International | Spain |
| 26 | Motorcycle racing | (Netherlands) 2016 Dutch TT | International | MotoGP: (Australia) Jack Miller ( (Belgium) Estrella Galicia 0,0 Marc VDS); Moto2: (Japan) Takaaki Nakagami ( (Japan) Idemitsu Honda Team Asia); Moto3: (Italy) Francesco Bagnaia ( (Spain) Aspar Mahindra Team MotoGP) |
| 26–3 July | Basketball | (Moldova) 2016 FIBA European Championship for Small Countries | Continental | Armenia |
| 27–10 July | Tennis | (United Kingdom) 2016 Wimbledon Championships (Grand Slam #3) | International | Men: (United Kingdom) Andy Murray; Women: (United States) Serena Williams |
| 28–3 July | Basketball | (Gibraltar) 2016 FIBA Women's European Championship for Small Countries | Continental | Malta |
| 28–3 July | Mountain bike racing | (Czech Republic) 2016 UCI Mountain Bike & Trials World Championships (XCO & XCE only) | International | Switzerland |
| 30–July 2 | Radio-controlled racing | (Slovakia) 2016 EFRA European 1:10 Electric Touring Car Championship | Continental | (Germany) Ronald Völker ( (Japan) Yokomo) |
| 30–3 July | Golf | (United States) 2016 WGC-Bridgestone Invitational | International | (United States) Dustin Johnson |
