= 2012 MENA Golf Tour =

Golf tour season

2012 MENA Golf Tour season
- Duration: 24 September 2012 – 31 October 2012
- Number of official events: 6
- Order of Merit: (Wales) Stephen Dodd

The 2012 MENA Golf Tour was the second season of the MENA Golf Tour.

== Schedule ==
The following table lists official events during the 2012 season.

Date	Tournament	Host country	Purse (US$)	Winner (Note: The number in brackets after each winner's name is the number of MENA Golf Tour events they had won up to and including that tournament.)
26 Sep	Dubai Creek Open	UAE	50,000	(England) Zane Scotland (2)
3 Oct	Abu Dhabi Golf Citizen Open	UAE	50,000	(England) Ross McGowan (1)
10 Oct	American Express Dirab Golf Championship	Saudi Arabia	50,000	(Pakistan) Shafiq Masih (1)
17 Oct	Ras Al Khaimah Classic	UAE	50,000	(Pakistan) Mohammad Munir (1)
24 Oct	Shaikh Maktoum Dubai Open	UAE	50,000	(Wales) Stephen Dodd (1)
31 Oct	MENA Golf Tour Championship	UAE	75,000	(England) William Harrold (1)

== Order of Merit ==
The Order of Merit was based on prize money won during the season, calculated in U.S. dollars.

Position	Player	Prize money ($)
1	(Wales) Stephen Dodd	27,636
2	(England) Zane Scotland	25,697
3	(England) William Harrold	20,455
4	(Pakistan) Mohammad Munir	17,020
5	(Wales) Craig Smith	13,314
