= 2013 MENA Golf Tour =

Golf tour season

2013 MENA Golf Tour season
- Duration: 12 March 2013 – 13 November 2013
- Number of official events: 10
- Most wins: (England) Zane Scotland (4)
- Order of Merit: (England) Zane Scotland

The 2013 MENA Golf Tour was the third season of the MENA Golf Tour.

== Schedule ==
The following table lists official events during the 2013 season.

Date	Tournament	Host country	Purse (US$)	Winner (Note: The number in brackets after each winner's name is the number of MENA Golf Tour events they had won up to and including that tournament.)
14 Mar	Royal Golf Dar Es Salam Open	Morocco	50,000	(England) Zane Scotland (3)
21 Mar	Royal D'Anfa Open	Morocco	50,000	(Wales) Stephen Dodd (2)
25 Sep	Dubai Creek Open	UAE	50,000	(England) Zane Scotland (3)
2 Oct	American Express Dirab Golf Championship	Saudi Arabia	50,000	(Taiwan) Mou Chung-hao (1)
9 Oct	Shaikh Maktoum Dubai Open	UAE	50,000	(England) Zane Scotland (4)
16 Oct	Ras Al Khaimah Classic	UAE	50,000	(England) Zane Scotland (5)
23 Oct	Abu Dhabi Golf Citizen Open	UAE	50,000	(Wales) Stephen Dodd (3)
30 Oct	Qatar Classic	Qatar	50,000	(England) Lee Corfield (1)
6 Nov	Ghala Valley	Oman	50,000	(Monaco) Sandro Piaget (1)
13 Nov	MENA Golf Tour Championship	UAE	75,000	(England) Lee Corfield (2)

== Order of Merit ==
The Order of Merit was based on prize money won during the season, calculated in U.S. dollars.

Position	Player	Prize money ($)
1	(England) Zane Scotland	50,229
2	(Wales) Stephen Dodd	32,213
3	(England) Lee Corfield	25,821
4	(England) Ian Keenan	20,820
5	(Morocco) Faycal Serghini	14,974
