= 2025–26 MENA Golf Tour =

Golf tour season

2025–26 MENA Golf Tour season
- Duration: 25 November 2025 – 4 March 2026
- Number of official events: 8 (Note: A further four tournaments were cancelled.)
- Most wins: (England) Chris Wood (3)
- Order of Merit: (England) Chris Wood

The 2025–26 MENA Golf Tour was the 11th season of the MENA Golf Tour.

== Changes for 2025–26 ==
Following a hiatus in 2024 and not having staged their own event since April 2023, the tour announced in August 2025 it would relaunch again later that year. The tour was returning under the guidance of new Commissioner, Keith Waters, former chief at the European Tour. The tour was also rebranded as the MENA Golf Tour, the name which it took for its first seven seasons.

== Schedule ==
The following table lists official events during the 2025–26 season.

Date	Tournament	Host country	Purse (US$)	Winner (Note: The number in brackets after each winner's name is the number of MENA Golf Tour events they had won up to and including that tournament.)	OWGR points
27 Nov	PGA Aroeira Challenge	Portugal	100,000	(Italy) Ludovico Addabbo (1)	1.20
4 Dec	Rolear Algarve Classic	Portugal	100,000	(England) Chris Wood (1)	1.34
21 Jan	Egypt Golf Series New Giza Golf Club	Egypt	100,000	(Finland) Lauri Ruuska (1)	0.82
26 Jan	Egypt Golf Series - Address Marassi 1	Egypt	100,000	(England) Chris Wood (2)	1.08
31 Jan	Egypt Golf Series - Address Marassi 2	Egypt	100,000	(Wales) Jack Davidson (1)	1.15
5 Feb	Egypt Golf Series Madinaty Golf Club	Egypt	100,000	(Spain) Juan Salama (1)	0.99
28 Feb	Al Houara Classic	Morocco	100,000	(England) Chris Wood (3)	1.07
4 Mar	Hilton Classic	Morocco	100,000	(France) Pierre Pineau (1)	1.10
~~11 Mar~~	Ayla Classic	Jordan	–	Cancelled	–
~~15 Mar~~	Ayla Championship	Jordan	–	Cancelled	–
~~25 Mar~~	Qatar Classic	Qatar	–	Cancelled	–
~~1 Apr~~	Al Ain Championship	UAE	–	Cancelled	–

== Order of Merit ==
The Order of Merit was based on tournament results during the season, calculated using a points-based system. The leading player on the Order of Merit earned status to play on the 2026 Challenge Tour (HotelPlanner Tour).

Position	Player	Points
1	(England) Chris Wood	59,320
2	(Spain) Juan Salama	33,050
3	(France) Pierre Pineau	31,532
4	(Wales) Jack Davidson	30,355
5	(Italy) Ludovico Addabbo	27,553
