= 2014 MENA Golf Tour =

Golf tour season

2014 MENA Golf Tour season
- Duration: 18 March 2014 – 4 November 2014
- Number of official events: 9
- Most wins: (England) Zane Scotland (2)
- Order of Merit: (England) Joshua White

The 2014 MENA Golf Tour was the fourth season of the MENA Golf Tour.

== Schedule ==
The following table lists official events during the 2014 season.

Date	Tournament	Host country	Purse (US$)	Winner (Note: The number in brackets after each winner's name is the number of MENA Golf Tour events they had won up to and including that tournament.)
20 Mar	Royal Golf D'Anfa Open	Morocco	50,000	(England) Joshua White (1)
27 Mar	Royal Golf Dar Es Salam Open	Morocco	50,000	(France) Édouard España (1)
17 Sep	Dubai Creek Open	UAE	50,000	(New Zealand) Trevor Marshall (1)
24 Sep	Shaikh Maktoum Dubai Open	UAE	50,000	(Czech Republic) Cyril Suk (1)
1 Oct	Ascorp Golf Citizen Abu Dhabi Open	UAE	50,000	(England) Luke Joy (1)
8 Oct	Ras Al Khaimah Classic	UAE	50,000	(Morocco) Ahmed Marjan (1)
22 Oct	Ghala Valley	Oman	50,000	(England) Zane Scotland (7)
29 Oct	Golf Citizen Masters	UAE	25,000	(England) Zane Scotland (8)
4 Nov	MENA Golf Tour Championship	UAE	75,000	(England) Lee Corfield (3)

== Order of Merit ==
The Order of Merit was based on prize money won during the season, calculated in U.S. dollars.

Position	Player	Prize money ($)
1	(England) Joshua White	28,471
2	(England) Luke Joy	27,066
3	(England) Zane Scotland	25,604
4	(England) Lee Corfield	19,762
5	(Spain) Carlos Balmaseda	15,746
