= Andrew Marshall (golfer) =

English golfer (born 1973)

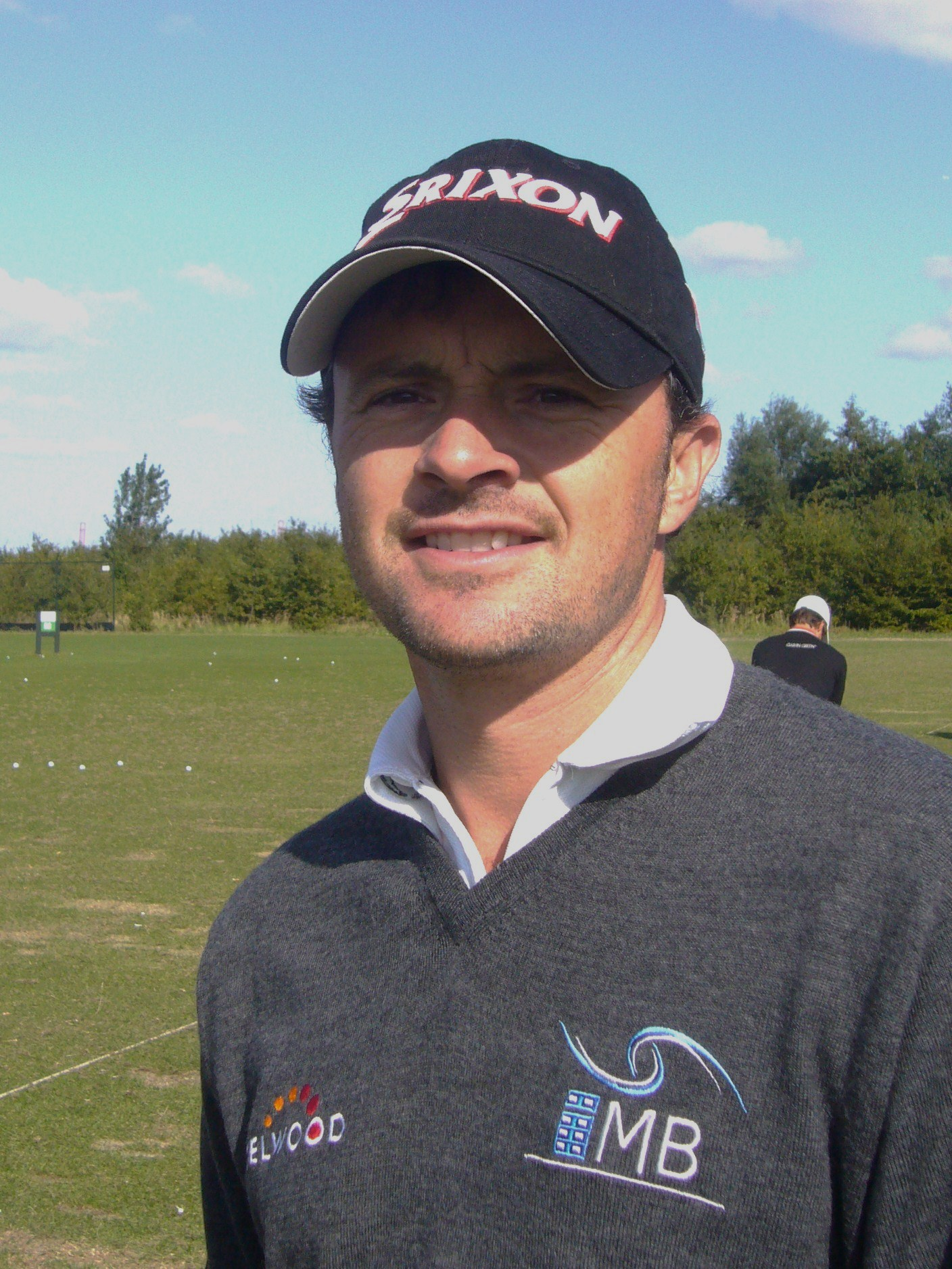

Personal information
- Full name: Andrew Charles Marshall
- Nationality: England
- Born: 24 August 1973 (age 53) Sutton-in-Ashfield, England
- Height: 5 ft 9 in (1.75 m)

Career
- Sport: Golf
- Turned professional: 1995
- Current tour: European Senior Tour
- Former tours: European Tour; Challenge Tour; PGA EuroPro Tour; MENA Tour
- Professional wins: 6

Number of wins by tour
- European Senior Tour: 1
- Other: 5

Best results in major championships
- Masters Tournament: DNP
- PGA Championship: DNP
- U.S. Open: DNP
- The Open Championship: T48: 2006

Andrew Charles Marshall (born 24 August 1973) is an English professional golfer.

== Career ==
Marshall was born in Sutton-in-Ashfield and turned professional in 1995. In 2001, he finished 4th on the Challenge Tour Rankings to earn his card on the top level European Tour. In late 2001, in one of his first tournaments as a full member of the European Tour he finished 6th at the Omega Hong Kong Open. However, he failed to build on that start and had to regain his card via qualifying school at the end of the 2002.

Marshall maintained his playing status through the end of the 2007 season, with a best end of season ranking of 73rd on the Order of Merit in 2006, and best tournament results of runner-up at the 2003 Madeira Island Open and the 2006 Johnnie Walker Championship at Gleneagles. In 2007, he slipped down the rankings and had to drop down to the Challenge Tour for 2008.

== Professional wins (6) ==
=== PGA EuroPro Tour wins (2) ===
No.	Date	Tournament	Winning score	Margin of victory	Runner-up
1	29 Apr 2005	Partypoker.com Classic	−10 (70-68-68=206)	1 stroke	(Australia) Daniel Gaunt
2	24 Jul 2015	Wealth Design Invitational	−14 (65-66-68=199)	2 strokes	(England) David Booth

=== MENA Golf Tour wins (2) ===
No.	Date	Tournament	Winning score	Margin of victory	Runner-up
1	30 Mar 2016	El Jadida Championship	−5 (70-69-72=211)	2 strokes	(Austria) Florian Praegant
2	14 Sep 2016	Shaikh Maktoum Dubai Open	−8 (68-67-73=208)	Playoff	(England) Adam Sagar

=== Other wins (1) ===
- 2021 Farmfoods British Par 3 Championship

=== European Senior Tour wins (1) ===
No.	Date	Tournament	Winning score	Margin of victory	Runners-up
1	25 Oct 2025	Sergio Melpignano Senior Italian Open	−14 (67-69-66=202)	2 strokes	(France) Lionel Alexandre, (Sweden) Johan Edfors

== Results in major championships ==
Tournament	2005	2006
The Open Championship	CUT	T48

Note: Marshall only played in The Open Championship.
CUT = missed the half-way cut
"T" = tied

== See also ==
- 2011 European Tour Qualifying School graduates
