= August 2016 in sports =

<<	August 2016					>>
Su	Mo	Tu	We	Th	Fr	Sa
	1	2	3	4	5	6
7	8	9	10	11	12	13
14	15	16	17	18	19	20
21	22	23	24	25	26	27
28	29	30	31
Sports

This list shows notable sports-related events and notable outcomes that occurred in June of 2016.

== Events calendar ==
Date	Sport	Venue/Event	Status	Winner/s
5–21	Multi-sport	(Brazil) 2016 Summer Olympics	International	United States
6–7	Triathlon	(Canada) ITU Triathlon World Cup #7	International	Men: (Norway) Kristian Blummenfelt; Women: (Bermuda) Flora Duffy
8–14	Radio-controlled racing	(Italy) 2016 IFMAR 1:10 200mm Nitro Touring Car World Championship	International	(Germany) Dominic Greiner ( (Netherlands) Serpent)
9	Association football	(Norway) 2016 UEFA Super Cup	Continental	(Spain) Real Madrid
11–14	Radio-controlled 1:10 off-road	(United States) 2016 ROAR 1:10 Electric Off-Road Modified National Championship	Domestic	2WD: (United States) Dakotah Phend ( (United States) TLR); 4WD: (United States) Ryan Maifield ( (United States) TLR)
11–15	Golf	(United States) U.S. Senior Open	International	(United States) Gene Sauers
13–21	Tennis	(United States) 2016 Cincinnati Masters	International	Men: (Croatia) Marin Čilić; Women: (Czech Republic) Karolína Plíšková
14	Speedway	2016 FIM Grand Prix of Sweden	International	(United States) Greg Hancock
14	Motorcycle racing	(Austria) 2016 Austrian motorcycle Grand Prix	International	MotoGP: (Italy) Andrea Iannone ( (Italy) Ducati Team); Moto2: (France) Johann Zarco ( (Finland) Ajo Motorsport); Moto3: (Spain) Joan Mir ( (Germany) Leopard Racing)
16–20	Snooker	(Belgium) 2016 IBSF World Under-18 Snooker Championship	International	Men: (Wales) Jackson Page; Women: (Thailand) Siripaporn Nuanthakhamjan
18–28	Little League Baseball	(United States) 2016 Little League World Series	International	(United States) / (New York (state)) Maine-Endwell Little League
20–22	Radio-controlled racing	(China) 2016 IFMAR 1:12 Electric Track World Championship	International	(Japan) Naoto Matsukura ( (Hong Kong) Roche)
20–25	Snooker	(Belgium) 2016 IBSF World Under-21 Snooker Championship	International	Men: (China) Xu Si; Women: (Thailand) Nutcharat Wongharuthai
20–11 September	Road bicycle racing	(Spain) Vuelta a España	International	(Colombia) Nairo Quintana ( (Spain) Movistar Team)
20–8 October	Rugby union	(Argentina) / (Australia) / (New Zealand) / (South Africa) 2016 Rugby Championship	International	New Zealand
21	Motorcycle racing	2016 Czech Republic motorcycle Grand Prix	International	MotoGP: (United Kingdom) Cal Crutchlow ( (Monaco) LCR Honda); Moto2: (Germany) Jonas Folger ( (Germany) Dynavolt Intact GP); Moto3: (United Kingdom) John McPhee ( (Germany) Peaugeot MC Saxoprint)
21–26	Rowing	(Netherlands) 2016 World Rowing U23 Championships	International	Netherlands
21–27	Rowing	(Netherlands) 2016 World Rowing Championships	International	Great Britain
24–27	Radio-controlled racing	(China) 2016 IFMAR ISTC World Championship	International	(Germany) Ronald Völker ( (Japan) Yokomo)
24–28	Rowing	(Netherlands) World Rowing Junior Championships 2016	International	Italy
25	Athletics	(Switzerland) Athletissima (DL #11)	International	United States
26–3 September	Water polo	(Montenegro) 2016 FINA Men's Youth Water Polo World Championships	International	Croatia
27	Speedway	2016 FIM Gorzow Grand Prix of Poland	International	(Australia) Jason Doyle
27	Athletics	(France) Meeting Areva (DL #12)	International	United States
27–4 September	Volleyball	(Hungary) / (Slovakia) 2016 Women's U19 Volleyball European Championship	Continental	Russia
28	Formula One	(Belgium) 2016 Belgian Grand Prix	International	(Germany) Nico Rosberg ( (Germany) Mercedes)
29–3 September	Mountain bike trials	(Italy) 2016 UCI Mountain Bike & Trials World Championships (Trials only)	International	Spain
29–4 September	Canoe polo	(Italy) 2016 Canoe Polo World Championships	International	Men: Italy; Women: New Zealand; Men Under 21: United Kingdom; Women Under 21: Germany
29–11 September	Tennis	(United States) 2016 US Open (Grand Slam #4)	International	Men: (Switzerland) Stan Wawrinka; Women: (Germany) Angelique Kerber
30–4 September	Amateur wrestling	(France) 2016 World Junior Wrestling Championships	International	Freestyle: Russia; Greco-Roman: Georgia; Women: Japan
