= 2016 BMW PGA Championship =

Tournament information
- Dates: 26–29 May 2016
- Location: Virginia Water, Surrey, England; 51.40°N 0.59°W
- Courses: Wentworth Club; West Course
- Tour: European Tour

Statistics
- Par: 72
- Length: 7,302 yards (6,677 m)
- Field: 150 players, 69 after cut
- Cut: 145 (+1)
- Prize fund: €5,000,000
- Winner's share: €833,330

Champion
- (England) Chris Wood
- 279 (−9)

Location map
- Location in England Location in Surrey

The 2016 BMW PGA Championship is the 62nd edition of the BMW PGA Championship, an annual golf tournament on the European Tour, held 26–29 May at the West Course of Wentworth Club in Virginia Water, Surrey, England, a suburb southwest of London.

Chris Wood won by one stroke over Rikard Karlberg.

== Course layout ==
Wentworth Club, West Course
Tee	Rating/Slope	1	2	3	4	5	6	7	8	9	Out	10	11	12	13	14	15	16	17	18	In	Total
Yardage	n/a	473	154	465	552	203	418	396	391	449	3,501	184	416	531	470	179	489	383	610	539	3,801	7,302
Par		4	3	4	5	3	4	4	4	4	35	3	4	5	4	3	4	4	5	5	37	72

== Round summaries ==
=== First round ===
Thursday, 26 May 2016

Place	Player	Score	To par
T1	(Australia) Scott Hend	65	−7
T1	(Netherlands) Joost Luiten	65	−7
T1	(South Korea) Yang Yong-eun	65	−7
4	(England) Danny Willett	66	−6
T5	(Australia) Richard Green	67	−5
T5	(England) Robert Rock	67	−5
T5	(South Africa) Jaco van Zyl	67	−5
T8	(Thailand) Kiradech Aphibarnrat	68	−4
T8	(England) Luke Donald	68	−4
T10	(Chile) Felipe Aguilar	69	−3
T10	(Spain) Eduardo de la Riva	69	−3
T10	(France) Victor Dubuisson	69	−3
T10	(Sweden) Rikard Karlberg	69	−3
T10	(England) Simon Khan	69	−3
T10	(Republic of Ireland) Shane Lowry	69	−3
T10	(Northern Ireland) Graeme McDowell	69	−3
T10	(Sweden) Alex Norén	69	−3
T10	(France) Julien Quesne	69	−3
T10	(France) Romain Wattel	69	−3
T10	(England) Guy Woodman	69	−3

=== Second round ===
Friday, 27 May 2016

Place	Player	Score	To par
T1	(Australia) Scott Hend	65-69=134	−10
T1	(England) Danny Willett	66-68=134	−10
T1	(South Korea) Yang Yong-eun	65-69=134	−10
4	(South Africa) Jaco van Zyl	67-68=135	−9
5	(Spain) Jorge Campillo	71-67=138	−6
T6	(Thailand) Kiradech Aphibarnrat	68-71=139	−5
T6	(Spain) Rafa Cabrera-Bello	71-68=139	−5
T6	(England) Robert Dinwiddie	70-69=139	−5
T6	(Sweden) Peter Hanson	70-69=139	−5
T6	(Netherlands) Joost Luiten	65-74=139	−5

=== Third round ===
Saturday, 28 May 2016

Place	Player	Score	To par
1	(Australia) Scott Hend	65-69-73=207	−9
2	(England) Tyrrell Hatton	72-70-66=208	−8
T3	(England) Lee Westwood	71-70-68=209	−7
T3	(South Korea) Yang Yong-eun	65-69-75=209	−7
T5	(South Africa) Thomas Aiken	71-69-70=210	−6
T5	(Germany) Martin Kaymer	70-70-70=210	−6
T5	(France) Julien Quesne	69-74-67=210	−6
T5	(South Africa) Jaco van Zyl	67-68-75=210	−6
T5	(England) Danny Willett	66-68-76=210	−6
T5	(England) Chris Wood	72-70-68=210	−6

=== Final round ===
Sunday, 29 May 2016

Place	Player	Score	To par	Prize money (€)
1	(England) Chris Wood	72-70-68-69=279	−9	833,330
2	(Sweden) Rikard Karlberg	69-74-72-65=280	−8	555,550
3	(England) Danny Willett	66-68-76-71=281	−7	313,000
T4	(South Africa) Thomas Aiken	71-69-70-72=282	−6	212,333
T4	(France) Julien Quesne	69-74-67-72=282	−6	212,333
T4	(France) Romain Wattel	69-73-70-70=282	−6	212,333
T7	(England) Tyrrell Hatton	72-70-66-75=283	−5	115,800
T7	(England) Andrew Johnston	76-69-71-67=283	−5	115,800
T7	(Germany) Martin Kaymer	70-70-70-73=283	−5	115,800
T7	(South Africa) Jaco van Zyl	67-68-75-73=283	−5	115,800
T7	(Paraguay) Fabrizio Zanotti	72-70-72-69=283	−5	115,800
