= Chris Wood (golfer) =

English professional golfer (born 1987)

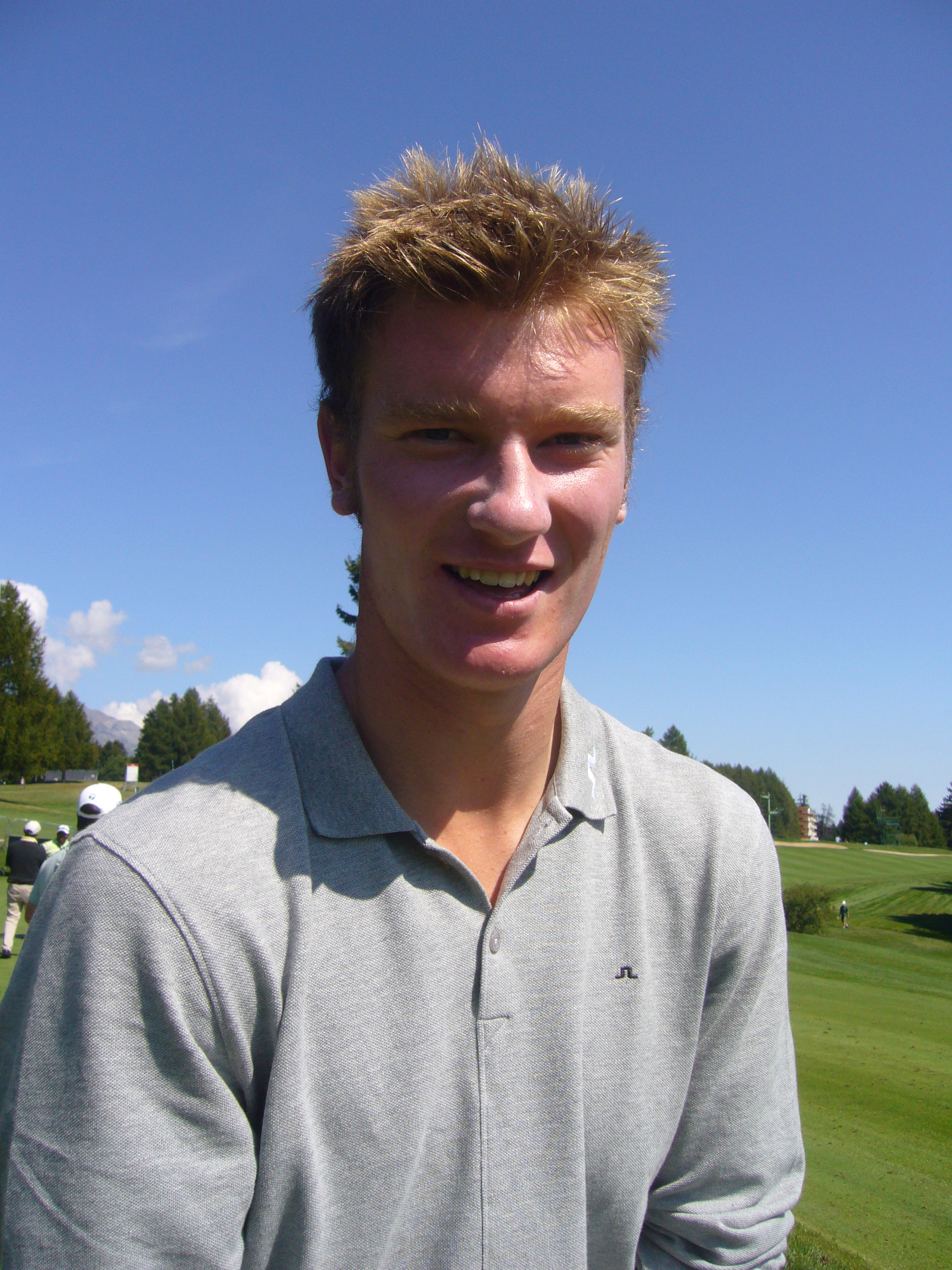

Personal information
- Full name: Christopher James Wood
- Nationality: England
- Born: 26 November 1987 (age 38) Bristol, England
- Height: 6 ft 6 in (1.98 m)
- Weight: 198 lb (90 kg; 14.1 st)

Career
- Sport: Golf
- Turned professional: 2008
- Current tour: Challenge Tour
- Former tours: European Tour; MENA Golf Tour
- Professional wins: 8
- Highest ranking: 22 (29 May 2016)

Number of wins by tour
- European Tour: 3
- Challenge Tour: 1
- Other: 4

Best results in major championships
- Masters Tournament: T42: 2016
- PGA Championship: T33: 2017
- U.S. Open: T23: 2016
- The Open Championship: T3: 2009

Achievements and awards
- Sir Henry Cotton Rookie of the Year: 2009
- MENA Golf Tour Order of Merit winner: 2025–26

Christopher James Wood (born 26 November 1987) is an English professional golfer who currently plays on the European Tour. He was the low amateur in the 2008 Open Championship at Royal Birkdale and tied for third in the following year's tournament held at Turnberry.

== Amateur career ==
Wood was born in Bristol, England. He went to school at Golden Valley Primary School in Nailsea between the ages of 4 and 11, before leaving to join Backwell School. He began playing golf at a young age. He was a keen footballer with aspirations to play for Bristol City Football Club but following a serious knee injury he devoted himself to golf. He became a member at the Long Ashton Golf Club near Bristol at the age of 9 and obtained a single-figure handicap by age 12. Wood was the English Amateur Order of Merit winner in 2007 and 2008.

In May 2008, Wood won the Welsh Open Amateur Stroke Play Championship at Conwy. He finished with a score of 289 (74–75–69–71) to take the title by six strokes over teammate Sam Hutsby and by eight over Jamie Abbott from Suffolk. After his victory Wood said "I putted much better today. I stayed pretty patient all the way around. My swing felt good and playing with Gary Wolstenholme kept me relaxed. This is the biggest event I've won so I may take a few days off now."

On 17 July 2008, Wood teed off at Royal Birkdale for the 2008 Open Championship with his father as his caddie. He raised speculation in the press that he could have become the first amateur to win the tournament since Bobby Jones, who won it in 1926, 1927 and 1930. He spoke about his qualification into the weekend of The Open and play at the tournament; "I love playing in front of a crowd," he said after a three over par third round 73. "I've been getting standing ovations on every green. It's been awesome. But I must admit it is now getting daunting for me and I got nervous when they announced my name on the first tee in the third round." He finished joint fifth overall alongside Jim Furyk and was awarded the silver medal as the top amateur.

== Professional career ==
After his success at the Open championship, Wood decided to turn professional. In November he gained his European Tour card for 2009 by finishing in a tie for 5th at qualifying school held at PGA Golf de Catalunya near Girona, Spain; "I've worked really hard for this so I feel like I deserve everything I've achieved, but this does cap a pretty amazing year for me," he said.

Through July of his rookie season, Wood has made 13 of 17 cuts while recording four top-10 finishes. A superb final round at Turnberry in the 2009 Open Championship put Wood in contention for his first major win. A birdie at the final hole would have sufficed but Wood's approach took a hard bounce and ran through the green. A par would have seen him contest the playoff but his par putt finished on the edge of the hole so he had to settle for a joint 3rd-place finish with Lee Westwood. "I've never hit a nine iron 210 yards in my life," he told BBC Sport. "There's nothing I could have done about it. It went miles."

Thanks to his performance at the Open, Wood qualified for the Dubai World Championship and was named the European Tour's rookie of the year. Finishing in the top four at the Open also gave Wood a spot in the 2010 Masters Tournament. He missed the cut by seven strokes.

Wood made a good start to 2011 by tying for the Africa Open but lost to Open champion Louis Oosthuizen on the first playoff hole.

Wood claimed his maiden championship in August 2012 when he took the Thailand Open on the OneAsia Tour. He followed this by winning the Commercial Bank Qatar Masters in January 2013, his first European Tour victory, making an eagle on the last hole to win by one stroke. "It's a dream come true," he said after his three-under-par 69 took him to 18 under. "There's an enormous weight lifted off my shoulders. I feel like I can go on and win more. I knew it was going to be hard no matter how I played – winning on the European Tour is not easy."

In June 2015, Wood won his second European tour title at the Lyoness Open with a two-stroke victory over Rafa Cabrera-Bello. He started the day five shots behind leader Grégory Bourdy, but shot a bogey-free final round of 67 to take the victory.

The 2016 season started with a third place at the Nedbank Golf Challenge in Sun City, South Africa. In May, Wood won the 2016 BMW PGA Championship at Wentworth Club; the win lifted him at the 22nd place of the Official World Golf Ranking and guaranteed him an automatic selection for the 2016 Ryder Cup.

Wood paired up with Justin Rose in his career debut at the Ryder Cup for a 1 up victory against Jimmy Walker and Zach Johnson in Saturday's foursomes; in the singles, he lost (1 up) to Dustin Johnson.

After a period of decline, including a brief retirement in 2023 and failure to qualify for the European Tour in 2025, Wood qualified for the revived MENA Golf Tour after winning the tour's Q-School by six shots. He secured his first professional win in nine years at the tour's second event, the Rolear Algarve Classic. He went on to win the Order of Merit for the 2025–26 season and earned full status on the Challenge Tour for the remainder of the 2026 season.

In his first Challenge Tour start of 2026, Wood won the Italian Challenge Open.

== Amateur wins ==
- 2007 Russian Amateur Championship
- 2008 Welsh Amateur Open Stroke Play Championship

== Professional wins (8) ==
=== European Tour wins (3) ===
Legend
Flagship events (1)
Other European Tour (2)

No.	Date	Tournament	Winning score	Margin of victory	Runner(s)-up
1	26 Jan 2013	Commercial Bank Qatar Masters	−18 (67-70-64-69=270)	1 stroke	(South Africa) George Coetzee, (Spain) Sergio García
2	14 Jun 2015	Lyoness Open	−15 (67-69-70-67=273)	2 strokes	(Spain) Rafa Cabrera-Bello
3	29 May 2016	BMW PGA Championship	−9 (72-70-68-69=279)	1 stroke	(Sweden) Rikard Karlberg

European Tour playoff record (0–1)

No.	Year	Tournament	Opponents	Result
1	2011	Africa Open	(South Africa) Louis Oosthuizen, (Spain) Manuel Quirós	Oosthuizen won with birdie on first extra hole

=== Challenge Tour wins (1) ===
No.	Date	Tournament	Winning score	Margin of victory	Runner-up
1	10 May 2026	Italian Challenge Open	−22 (67-64-68-66=266)	1 stroke	(Portugal) Tomás Gouveia

=== MENA Golf Tour wins (3) ===
No.	Date	Tournament	Winning score	Margin of victory	Runner(s)-up
1	4 Dec 2025	Rolear Algarve Classic	−16 (65-68-67=200)	1 stroke	(Scotland) Aidan O'Hagan
2	26 Jan 2026	Egypt Golf Series - Address Marassi 1	−13 (66-66-71=203)	Playoff	(England) Charlie Crockett
3	28 Feb 2026	Al Houara Classic	−10 (71-68-67=206)	1 stroke	(England) Joseph Pagdin, (France) Pierre Pineau, (Republic of Ireland) Mark Power

=== OneAsia Tour wins (1) ===
No.	Date	Tournament	Winning score	Margin of victory	Runner-up
1	12 Aug 2012	Thailand Open	−23 (67-64-67-67=265)	2 strokes	(South Korea) Jang Dong-kyu

== Results in major championships ==
Tournament	2008	2009	2010	2011	2012	2013	2014	2015	2016	2017	2018
Masters Tournament			CUT						T42	CUT	
U.S. Open									T23	CUT	
The Open Championship	T5_{LA}	T3	CUT			T64	T23		WD	T14	T28
PGA Championship		T76	CUT			CUT	T46	CUT	CUT	T33	CUT

Tournament	2019
Masters Tournament	
PGA Championship	
U.S. Open	
The Open Championship	CUT

Top 10
Did not play

LA = Low amateur
CUT = missed the half-way cut
WD = withdrew
"T" = tied

=== Summary ===
Tournament	Wins	2nd	3rd	Top-5	Top-10	Top-25	Events	Cuts made
Masters Tournament	0	0	0	0	0	0	3	1
PGA Championship	0	0	0	0	0	0	8	3
U.S. Open	0	0	0	0	0	1	2	1
The Open Championship	0	0	1	2	2	4	9	6
Totals	0	0	1	2	2	5	22	11

- Most consecutive cuts made – 3 (twice)
- Longest streak of top-10s – 2 (2008 Open Championship – 2009 Open Championship)

== Results in World Golf Championships ==
Results not in chronological order before 2015.

Tournament	2010	2011	2012	2013	2014	2015	2016	2017
Championship				T43			T42	T28
Match Play	R64			R64			T61	T39
Invitational				T7				73
Champions				T39		T51	T23	

Top 10
Did not play

QF, R16, R32, R64 = Round in which player lost in match play
WD = withdrew
"T" = tied

== Team appearances ==
Amateur

- European Amateur Team Championship (representing England): 2008
- Bonallack Trophy (representing Europe): 2008 (winners)

Professional

- Seve Trophy (representing Great Britain & Ireland): 2009 (winners), 2013
- World Cup (representing England): 2013, 2016
- EurAsia Cup (representing Europe): 2016 (winners)
- Ryder Cup (representing Europe) : 2016

Ryder Cup points record

2016	Total
1	1

== See also ==
- 2008 European Tour Qualifying School graduates
