= India Lee =

British triathlete

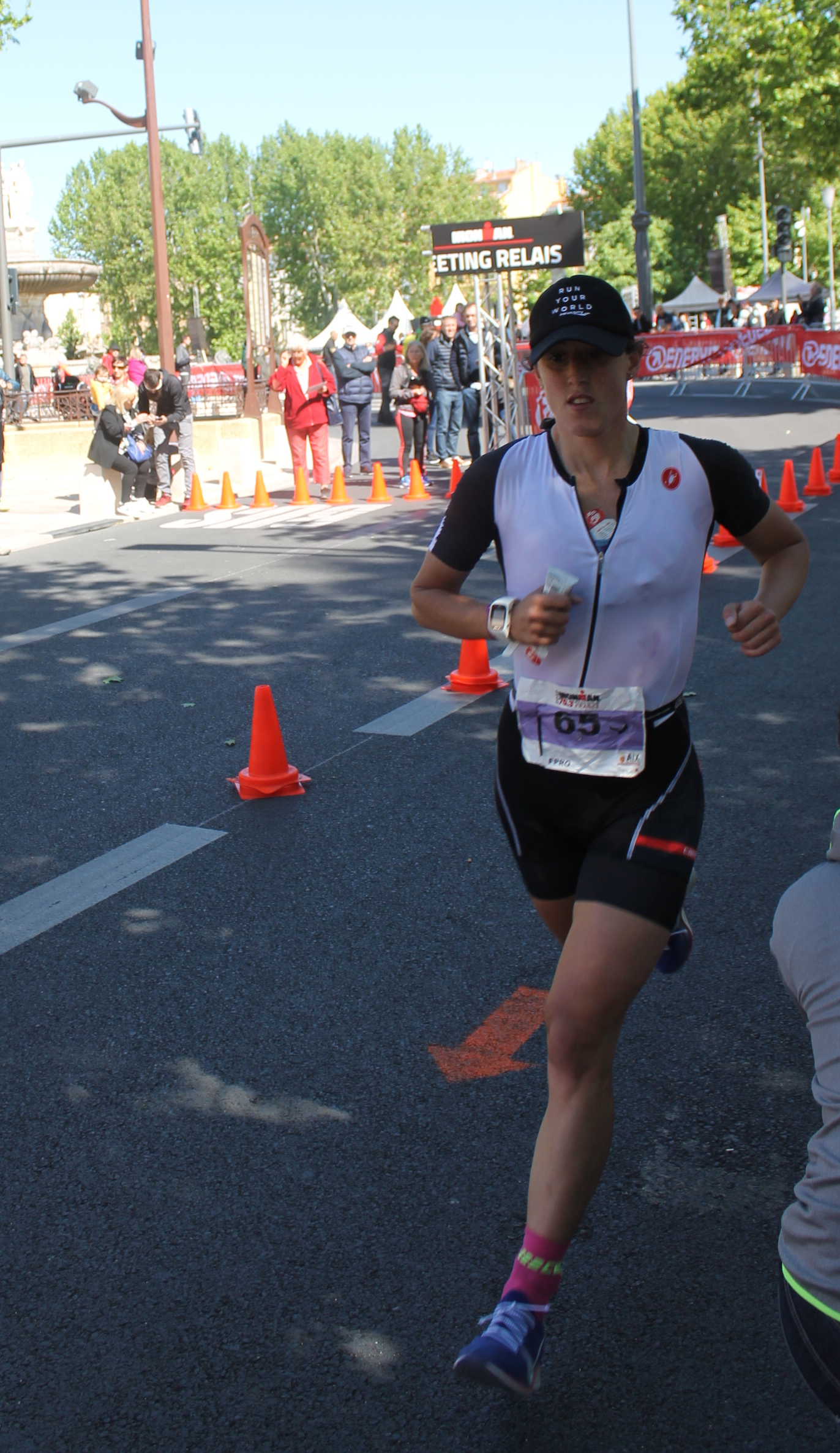
- India Lee IMPA 2019

Personal information
- Full name: India Lee
- Nationality: British
- Born: 1988 (age 37–38)

Sport
- Country: Great Britain
- Sport: Triathlon
- Coached by: Rhys Davey
Medal record
Representing United Kingdom
Women's Triathlon
ETU European Triathlon Championships
Gold medal – first place	ETU European Triathlon Championships	2016 Lisbon
Gold medal – first place	ETU European Triathlon Championships	2016 Lisbon
Ironman 70.3
Gold medal – first place	Ironman 70.3	2019 Lahti
Gold medal – first place	Ironman 70.3	2019 Weymouth
Gold medal – first place	Ironman 70.3	2018 Weymouth
Bronze medal – third place	Ironman 70.3	2019 Pays D'Aix

India Lee is a British professional triathlete competing at both short course (International Triathlon Union, ITU) and long course (Ironman 70.3) distances.

== Career ==
=== Short Course Triathlon ===
Lee's highest placing in short course triathlon was in 2016 when she became the European Triathlon Union (ETU) European Champion, duplicating this success with team GB in the mixed relay.

In the ITU Triathlon World Cup, she won the race at Cagliari in 2016.

=== Long Course Triathlon ===
In her debut at the 70.3 distance, Lee won the 2018 Weymouth 70.3 Ironman, repeating the feat at the same race in 2019.

Later in 2019 she took the win at the second edition of the Lahti 70.3 Ironman, with compatriot Katrina Matthews in Silver, and had success at IRONMAN 70.3 Pays d’Aix with Bronze in 2019, rounding out the podium behind race winner Emma Pallant and Silver medallist Nikki Bartlett.

Lee competed in her first Ironman 70.3 World Championships at Nice in 2019 coming 11th, and followed this by recording a 6th place at the Ironman 70.3 Middle East championships.

As a result of her placing in the latter race she secured a place at the Ironman 70.3 World Championships 2020, but due to the events of COVID-19 the 2020 Ironman and 70.3 Ironman World Championships were cancelled with dates for 2021 announced. It appears that athletes who qualified for these championships will be permitted to race at the 2021 editions.

In 2024 India Lee won the inaugural T100 World Tour (Formerly PTO) Race in Miami.

Lee currently has her training base in Bath, and is coached by Rhys Davey (coach of fellow Team GB triathlete Vicky Holland).

ITU Results

Date	Position	Event	Classification	Time
2020-07-21	2	2019 ITU World Triathlon Mixed Relay Series Edmonton	Mixed Relay	00:21:54
2020-03-24	13	2019 Huelva ETU Triathlon European Cup and Iberoamerican Championships	Elite Women	02:11:10
2020-03-08	26	2019 Daman World Triathlon Abu Dhabi	Elite Women	00:58:25
2019-02-10	15	2019 Discovery Triathlon World Cup Cape Town	Elite Women	00:58:59
2018-08-18	DNF	2018 Lausanne ITU Triathlon World Cup	Elite Women	DNF
2018-08-11	12	2018 Glasgow ETU Triathlon European Championships	Mixed Relay	00:19:46
2018-08-09	21	2018 Glasgow ETU Triathlon European Championships	Elite Women	02:05:35
2018-07-08	12	2018 Tiszaujvaros ITU Triathlon World Cup	Elite Women	01:00:52
2018-07-07	7	2018 Tiszaujvaros ITU Triathlon World Cup	Semifinal 1 Elite Women	00:59:55
2018-06-17	35	2018 Antwerp ITU Triathlon World Cup	Elite Women	01:06:14
2018-06-02	3	2018 Cagliari ITU Triathlon World Cup	Elite Women	01:00:14
2017-08-26	19	2017 ITU World Triathlon Stockholm	Elite Women	02:08:17
2017-07-15	26	2017 ITU World Triathlon Hamburg	Elite Women	01:01:43
2017-06-18	5	2017 Kitzbühel ETU Triathlon European Championships	Mixed Relay	00:19:27
2017-06-16	15	2017 Kitzbühel ETU Triathlon European Championships	Elite Women	02:01:24
2017-06-11	17	2017 ITU World Triathlon Leeds	Elite Women	02:04:06
2017-05-28	DNF	2017 Madrid ITU Triathlon World Cup	Elite Women	DNF
2017-03-03	16	2017 ITU World Triathlon Abu Dhabi	Elite Women	02:07:11
2016-07-16	41	2016 ITU World Triathlon Hamburg	Elite Women	00:59:20
2016-07-02	26	2016 ITU World Triathlon Stockholm	Elite Women	02:10:01
2016-05-29	1	2016 Lisbon ETU Triathlon European Championships	Mixed Relay	00:17:20
2016-05-28	1	2016 Lisbon ETU Triathlon European Championships	Elite Women	02:04:03
2016-05-08	1	2016 Cagliari ITU Triathlon World Cup	Elite Women	01:03:52
2016-04-02	DNF	2016 Quarteira ETU Triathlon European Cup	Elite Women	DNF
2016-03-12	3	2016 Sarasota CAMTRI Sprint Triathlon and Mixed Relay American Championships	Elite Women	01:00:06
2016-03-05	3	2016 Clermont CAMTRI Sprint Triathlon American Cup	Elite Women	01:00:06
2016-09-18	56	2015 ITU World Triathlon Grand Final Chicago	Elite Women	02:05:02
2015-08-22	26	2015 ITU World Triathlon Stockholm	Elite Women	02:06:02
2015-08-02	49	2015 Rio de Janeiro ITU World Olympic Qualification Event	Elite Women	02:07:59
2015-07-11	23	2015 Geneva ETU Triathlon European Championships	Elite Women	02:13:24
2015-05-03	3	2015 Antalya ETU Triathlon European Cup	Elite Women	02:01:25
2015-04-25	3	2015 Alcobendas ETU Sprint and Standard Distance Duathlon European Championships	Elite Women	02:07:28
2015-03-29	2	2015 GBR Sprint Duathlon National Championships	Elite Women	00:37:11
2015-03-21	14	2015 Quarteira ETU Triathlon European Cup	Elite Women	02:11:01
2014-09-21	12	2014 Madrid ETU Triathlon European Cup Final	Elite Women	02:16:28
2014-07-20	6	2014 Geneva ETU Triathlon European Cup	Elite Women	02:15:22
2014-06-15	4	2014 GBR Triathlon National Championships	Elite Women	02:06:09
2013-09-11	9	2013 London ITU Aquathlon World Championships	Elite Women	00:33:44
2013-08-10	26	2013 Tiszaujvaros ITU Triathlon World Cup	Semifinal 2 Elite Women	01:07:08
2013-07-13	15	2013 GBR Triathlon National Championships	Elite Women	01:08:28
2013-04-20	1	2013 Horst ETU Powerman Long Distance and Sprint Duathlon European Championships	25-29 Female AG Sprint	01:01:07
2013-01-01	9	2013 GBR Duathlon National Championships	Elite Women	01:05:37
