= MENA Golf Tour =

Professional golf tour

- Current season, competition or edition: 2025–26 MENA Golf Tour
- Formerly: MENA Tour
- Sport: Golf
- Founded: 2011
- Founder: Shaikh Maktoum Golf Foundation
- First season: 2011
- Commissioner: Keith Waters
- Countries: Based in the Middle East and North Africa (Note: Schedules also included events in Australia, England, Malaysia, Mexico, Portugal, Singapore, South Africa, Spain, Thailand and the United States.)
- Most titles: Tournament wins: (England) Zane Scotland (10)
- Website: https://www.menagolftour.com/

The MENA Golf Tour is a golf tour in the Middle East and North Africa. It was founded in 2011 by the Dubai-based Shaikh Maktoum Golf Foundation. It was previously affiliated to The R&A and the Arab Golf Federation. The previous iteration of the tour was open to both professionals and amateurs.

== History ==
The tour was founded in 2011, hosting its first event at Saadiyat Beach Golf Club in Abu Dhabi.

In 2016 and 2017, the top five professionals on the Order of Merit received Sunshine Tour cards for the following season, with those 6th to 15th earning entry into the final stage of the Sunshine Tour's Q School. The MENA Tour was included in the Official World Golf Ranking from May 2016, with three points awarded for 54-hole events and five for 72-hole events.

The tour was cancelled in 2018 but started again in 2019, with five events planned for February and March 2019 with a further five in October and November. The schedule was revised in 2020 with all tournaments being played from February to April. Because of the COVID-19 pandemic only 5 events were played. No tournaments were held in 2021. At the end of 2021 the tour announced its intention to merge with the Asian Development Tour in 2023, with a number of co-sanctioned events to be played in 2022. In October 2022, the MENA Tour entered into a "strategic alliance" with LIV Golf; the arrangement was conceived with the intent of immediately affording LIV Golf events Official World Golf Ranking points.

Following a hiatus in 2024 and not having staged their own event since April 2023, the tour announced in August 2025 it would relaunch again later that year. The tour was returning under the guidance of new Commissioner, Keith Waters, former chief at the European Tour. The tour would be rebranded as the MENA Golf Tour, the name which it took for its first seven seasons. The 2025-26 season scheduled twelve 54-hole tournaments with payouts of US$100,000 and a 36-hole cut of sixty plus ties. The season was cut short after eight events due to the 2026 Iran war. The leading player on the Order of Merit earned status to play on the Challenge Tour for the 2026 season.

== Order of Merit winners ==
Season	Winner	Points	Ref.
2025–26	(England) Chris Wood	59,320	
2022–23	(United States) Brooks Koepka	18,098,333	
2020–22	(England) Tom Sloman	28,870	
2019	(South Africa) Mathiam Keyser	45,153	
Season	Winner	Prize money (US$)	Ref.
2017	(England) Jamie Elson	36,677	
2016	(England) Craig Hinton	39,338	
2015	(South Africa) Thriston Lawrence	27,679	
2014	(England) Joshua White	28,471	
2013	(England) Zane Scotland	50,229	
2012	(Wales) Stephen Dodd	27,636	
2011	(England) Jake Shepherd	17,749	
