= Egyptian Handball Federation =

Governing body of handball in Egypt

Egyptian Handball Federation Arabic: اتحاد كرة اليد المصري EHF
- IOC nation: Egypt (EGY)
- Sport: Handball
- Other sports: Beach handball; Wheelchair handball
- Official website: www.ehf.com.eg

HISTORY
- Year of formation: 1957; 69 years ago

AFFILIATIONS
- International federation: International Handball Federation (IHF)
- IHF member since: 1960
- Continental association: African Handball Confederation
- National Olympic Committee: Egyptian Olympic Committee
- Other affiliation(s): Mediterranean Handball Confederation

GOVERNING BODY
- President: Mr. Khaled Fathy
- Address: El Estade El Bahary, Nasr City, Cairo
- Country: Egypt

The Egyptian Handball Federation (EHF) (Arabic: اتحاد كرة اليد المصري) is the governing body of handball and beach handball in Egypt. EHF was founded in 1957, joined the International Handball Federation in 1960, and the African Handball Confederation in 1973. EHF is also affiliated to the Egyptian Olympic Committee. It is based in Cairo.

== Competitions ==
- Egyptian Handball League

== Honours ==
=== International ===
Men's

- Youth Olympics Games : 2010, 2014.
- U21 Handball World Championship : 1993, 1999, 2019.
- U19 Handball World Championship : 2019.
- U17 Handball World Championship : 2025.
- Beach Handball World Championship : 2004.

Mix

- Wheelchair Handball World Championship : 2024, 2022.

=== Continental ===
Men's

- African Handball Championship : 1991, 1992, 2000, 2004, 2008, 2016, 2020, 2022, 2024, 2026.
- U21 African Handball Championship : 1982, 1984, 1990, 1992, 1996, 1998, 2000, 2004, 2006, 2010, 2014, 2018, 2022, 2024, 2026.
- U19 African Handball Championship : 2004, 2008, 2010, 2012, 2014, 2018, 2022, 2024, 2026.
- African Games : 1965, 1991, 1995, 2003, 2007, 2011, 2015, 2023.

Women's

- U20 African Handball Championship : 2025.
- U18 African Handball Championship : 2015, 2017, 2019, 2022, 2023, 2025.

=== Regional ===
- Mediterranean Games : 2013, 2026.
- Mediterranean Championship : 2014, 2016.
- Arab Games : 1961, 1965, 1992, 1999, 2007, 2011.

== National teams ==
- Egypt men's national handball team
- Egypt men's national under-21 handball team
- Egypt men's national under-19 handball team
- Egypt men's national under-17 handball team
- Egypt men's national beach handball team
- Egypt women's national handball team
- Egypt women's national junior handball team
- Egypt women's national youth handball team
- Egypt national wheelchair handball team
