= 2025 IHF Men's U19 Handball World Championship =

Tournament details
- Host country: Egypt
- Venue(s): 4 (in 2 host cities)
- Dates: 6–17 August
- Teams: 32 (from 5 confederations)

Final positions
- Champions: Germany (1st title)
- Runners-up: Spain
- Third place: Denmark
- Fourth place: Sweden

Tournament statistics
- Matches played: 108
- Goals scored: 7,264 (67.26 per match)
- Top scorer(s): (Slovenia) Aljuš Anžič (67 goals)

Awards
- Best player: (Spain) Marcos Fis Ballester
- Best goalkeeper: (Germany) Finn Knaack

The 2025 IHF Men's U19 Handball World Championship was the 11th edition of the IHF Men's U19 Handball World Championship held from 6 to 17 August in Egypt under the aegis of International Handball Federation (IHF). It was first time in history that the championship was organised by Egyptian Handball Federation.

Spain were the defending champions but lost to Germany in the final, who secured their first title.

== Bidding process ==
Three nations entered bid for hosting the tournament:

- North Macedonia
- Poland
- Slovenia

North Macedonia and Poland later withdrew their bid. The tournament was initially awarded to Slovenia by the IHF Council in its meeting held in Cairo, Egypt on 28 February 2020. However, there were no further details on Slovenia's preparations four years later and were stripped of the hosting rights in September 2024, with Egypt being named the replacement.

== Qualification ==
Event	Dates	Host	Vacancies	Qualified
Host nation			1	Egypt
2024 U-18 European Championship	7–18 August 2024	(Montenegro) Podgorica	16	Austria; Croatia; Czech Republic; Denmark; Faroe Islands; France; Germany; Hungary; Iceland; Norway; Portugal; Serbia; Spain; Sweden; Slovenia; Switzerland
2024 Asian Youth Championship	3–14 September 2024	(Jordan) Amman	5	Bahrain; Japan; Kuwait; Saudi Arabia; South Korea
2024 African Youth Championship	19–26 September 2024	Tunisia	4	Algeria; Guinea; Morocco; Tunisia
2024 South and Central American Youth Championship	5–9 November 2024	(Nicaragua) Managua	3	Argentina; Brazil; Uruguay
2024 North America and Caribbean Youth Championship	20–24 November 2024	(Puerto Rico) Toa Baja	1	United States
IHF Trophy InterContinental Phase	12–16 March 2025	(Kosovo) Pristina	1	Kosovo
Wildcard	9 June 2025	―	1	Mexico

== Draw ==
The draw took place on 8 April in Cairo.

Pot 1	Pot 2	Pot 3	Pot 4
Sweden; Denmark; Hungary; Egypt; Iceland; Germany; Serbia; Norway	Spain; Slovenia; Portugal; Japan; Tunisia; Switzerland; Brazil; France	South Korea; Croatia; Guinea; Czech Republic; Kuwait; Morocco; Argentina; Uruguay	Saudi Arabia; Algeria; United States; Bahrain; Mexico (Note: Team not determined at time of draw); Faroe Islands; Austria; Kosovo

== Referees ==
The referee pairs were selected on 20 May 2025.

Referees
Argentina	Santiago Correa; Agustín Conberse
Brazil	Henrique Godoy; Karl Magalhães
China	Cheng Yufeng; Zhou Yunlei
Croatia	Ante Mikelić; Petar Parađina
Cuba	Raymel Reyes; Alexis Zuñiga
Egypt	Mahmoud El-Beltagy; Hamdy Mahmoud
Egypt	Heidy El-Saied; Yasmina El-Saied
France	Titouan Picard; Pierre Vauchez

Referees
Ivory Coast	Abdoulaye Koné; Joel Yapo
Kuwait	Maali Al-Enezi; Dalal Al-Nassem
Moldova	Alexei Covaliuc; Igor Covaliuc
North Macedonia	Ismailj Metalari; Nenad Nikolovski
Montenegro	Anđelina Kažanegra; Jelena Vujačić
Norway	Andreas Borge; Magnus Nygren
Oman	Omer Al-Shahi; Khamis Al-Wahbi

Referees
Portugal	Ruben Maia; André Nunes
Romania	Mihai Pîrvu; Radu Potîrniche
Saudi Arabia	Mohammed Al-Saqer; Ali Al-Suqufi
South Korea	Cha Chang-hwan; Pak Hyun-jin
Spain	Raúl Oyarzun; Aritz Zaragueta
Uruguay	Germán Araújo; Nicolás Perdomo
Uzbekistan	Khasan Ismoilov; Khusan Ismoilov

== Preliminary round ==
All times are local (UTC+3).

=== Group A ===
Pos	Team	Pld	W	D	L	GF	GA	GD	Pts	Qualification
1	Sweden	3	3	0	0	111	88	+23	6	Main round
2	Austria	3	2	0	1	101	96	+5	4	Main round
3	Portugal	3	1	0	2	108	98	+10	2	President's Cup
4	Kuwait	3	0	0	3	71	109	−38	0	President's Cup

Source: IHF
Rules for classification: 1) points; 2) head-to-head points; 3) head-to-head goal difference; 4) head-to-head number of goals scored; 5) goal difference.

6 August 2025; 12:45	Sweden	39–22	Kuwait	Hassan Moustafa Sports Hall, Giza; Referees: Reyes, Zuñiga (CUB)
6 August 2025; 12:45	Roganovic 6	(18–11)	Salmin 8	Hassan Moustafa Sports Hall, Giza; Referees: Reyes, Zuñiga (CUB)
6 August 2025; 12:45	3× (yellow card) 4× (suspension)	Report	3× (suspension)	Hassan Moustafa Sports Hall, Giza; Referees: Reyes, Zuñiga (CUB)

6 August 2025; 15:00	Portugal	36–37	Austria	Hassan Moustafa Sports Hall, Giza; Referees: Kažanegra, Vujačić (MNE)
6 August 2025; 15:00	Lourenço 11	(20–19)	Fritsch 7	Hassan Moustafa Sports Hall, Giza; Referees: Kažanegra, Vujačić (MNE)
6 August 2025; 15:00	3× (suspension)	Report	4× (suspension)	Hassan Moustafa Sports Hall, Giza; Referees: Kažanegra, Vujačić (MNE)

8 August 2025; 12:45	Austria	32–34	Sweden	Hassan Moustafa Sports Hall, Giza; Attendance: 150; Referees: Ismoilov, Ismoilov (UZB)
8 August 2025; 12:45	Baxter, Fritsch 8	(15–21)	Roganovic 9	Hassan Moustafa Sports Hall, Giza; Attendance: 150; Referees: Ismoilov, Ismoilov (UZB)
8 August 2025; 12:45	4× (suspension)	Report	4× (suspension)	Hassan Moustafa Sports Hall, Giza; Attendance: 150; Referees: Ismoilov, Ismoilov (UZB)

8 August 2025; 15:00	Portugal	38–23	Kuwait	Hassan Moustafa Sports Hall, Giza; Attendance: 110; Referees: Araújo, Perdomo (URU)
8 August 2025; 15:00	Lourenço 9	(19–13)	Salmin 6	Hassan Moustafa Sports Hall, Giza; Attendance: 110; Referees: Araújo, Perdomo (URU)
8 August 2025; 15:00	1× (yellow card) 4× (suspension)	Report	1× (yellow card) 2× (suspension)	Hassan Moustafa Sports Hall, Giza; Attendance: 110; Referees: Araújo, Perdomo (URU)

9 August 2025; 12:45	Kuwait	26–32	Austria	Hassan Moustafa Sports Hall, Giza; Attendance: 120; Referees: Metalari, Nikolovski (MKD)
9 August 2025; 12:45	Madwah 7	(16–18)	Tikvić 6	Hassan Moustafa Sports Hall, Giza; Attendance: 120; Referees: Metalari, Nikolovski (MKD)
9 August 2025; 12:45	1× (yellow card) 3× (suspension)	Report	3× (suspension)	Hassan Moustafa Sports Hall, Giza; Attendance: 120; Referees: Metalari, Nikolovski (MKD)

9 August 2025; 15:00	Sweden	38–34	Portugal	Hassan Moustafa Sports Hall, Giza; Attendance: 150; Referees: Picard, Vauchez (FRA)
9 August 2025; 15:00	three players 7	(22–16)	Lourenço 10	Hassan Moustafa Sports Hall, Giza; Attendance: 150; Referees: Picard, Vauchez (FRA)
9 August 2025; 15:00	1× (yellow card) 6× (suspension)	Report	1× (yellow card) 5× (suspension) 1× (red card)	Hassan Moustafa Sports Hall, Giza; Attendance: 150; Referees: Picard, Vauchez (FRA)

=== Group B ===
Pos	Team	Pld	W	D	L	GF	GA	GD	Pts	Qualification
1	Hungary	3	3	0	0	121	77	+44	6	Main round
2	Switzerland	3	2	0	1	96	89	+7	4	Main round
3	Kosovo	3	1	0	2	85	94	−9	2	President's Cup
4	Morocco	3	0	0	3	67	109	−42	0	President's Cup

Source: IHF
Rules for classification: 1) points; 2) head-to-head points; 3) head-to-head goal difference; 4) head-to-head number of goals scored; 5) goal difference.

6 August 2025; 17:15	Hungary	45–20	Morocco	Hassan Moustafa Sports Hall, Giza; Referees: Metalari, Nikolovski (MKD)
6 August 2025; 17:15	Gáncs-Peto 8	(25–11)	El Hassan 7	Hassan Moustafa Sports Hall, Giza; Referees: Metalari, Nikolovski (MKD)
6 August 2025; 17:15	4× (suspension)	Report	5× (suspension)	Hassan Moustafa Sports Hall, Giza; Referees: Metalari, Nikolovski (MKD)

6 August 2025; 19:30	Switzerland	35–25	Kosovo	Hassan Moustafa Sports Hall, Giza; Attendance: 150; Referees: Ismoilov, Ismoilov (UZB)
6 August 2025; 19:30	Mierzwa 7	(16–13)	Mulaj 8	Hassan Moustafa Sports Hall, Giza; Attendance: 150; Referees: Ismoilov, Ismoilov (UZB)
6 August 2025; 19:30	4× (suspension)	Report	2× (suspension)	Hassan Moustafa Sports Hall, Giza; Attendance: 150; Referees: Ismoilov, Ismoilov (UZB)

8 August 2025; 17:15	Kosovo	28–37	Hungary	Hassan Moustafa Sports Hall, Giza; Attendance: 160; Referees: Picard, Vauchez (FRA)
8 August 2025; 17:15	Mulaj 8	(14–22)	Fazekas 7	Hassan Moustafa Sports Hall, Giza; Attendance: 160; Referees: Picard, Vauchez (FRA)
8 August 2025; 17:15	1× (suspension)	Report	3× (suspension)	Hassan Moustafa Sports Hall, Giza; Attendance: 160; Referees: Picard, Vauchez (FRA)

8 August 2025; 19:30	Switzerland	32–25	Morocco	Hassan Moustafa Sports Hall, Giza; Attendance: 90; Referees: Kažanegra, Vujačić (MNE)
8 August 2025; 19:30	Mierzwa 10	(15–13)	Arent-Mansour 7	Hassan Moustafa Sports Hall, Giza; Attendance: 90; Referees: Kažanegra, Vujačić (MNE)
8 August 2025; 19:30	3× (suspension)	Report	2× (suspension)	Hassan Moustafa Sports Hall, Giza; Attendance: 90; Referees: Kažanegra, Vujačić (MNE)

9 August 2025; 17:15	Morocco	22–32	Kosovo	Hassan Moustafa Sports Hall, Giza; Referees: Reyes, Zuñiga (CUB)
9 August 2025; 17:15	Idriss 8	(10–12)	Pajaziti 8	Hassan Moustafa Sports Hall, Giza; Referees: Reyes, Zuñiga (CUB)
9 August 2025; 17:15	3× (suspension)	Report	4× (suspension)	Hassan Moustafa Sports Hall, Giza; Referees: Reyes, Zuñiga (CUB)

9 August 2025; 19:30	Hungary	39–29	Switzerland	Hassan Moustafa Sports Hall, Giza; Attendance: 180; Referees: Araújo, Perdomo (URU)
9 August 2025; 19:30	Mészáros 11	(21–16)	Cuencas 9	Hassan Moustafa Sports Hall, Giza; Attendance: 180; Referees: Araújo, Perdomo (URU)
9 August 2025; 19:30	3× (suspension)	Report	1× (yellow card) 4× (suspension)	Hassan Moustafa Sports Hall, Giza; Attendance: 180; Referees: Araújo, Perdomo (URU)

=== Group C ===
Pos	Team	Pld	W	D	L	GF	GA	GD	Pts	Qualification
1	Spain	3	3	0	0	129	78	+51	6	Main round
2	Serbia	3	2	0	1	82	89	−7	4	Main round
3	Croatia	3	1	0	2	95	93	+2	2	President's Cup
4	Algeria	3	0	0	3	70	116	−46	0	President's Cup

Source: IHF
Rules for classification: 1) points; 2) head-to-head points; 3) head-to-head goal difference; 4) head-to-head number of goals scored; 5) goal difference.

6 August 2025; 17:15	Serbia	26–25	Croatia	New Capital Sports Hall, Cairo; Attendance: 100; Referees: Correa, Conberse (ARG)
6 August 2025; 17:15	Cenić 11	(14–8)	Tomić 8	New Capital Sports Hall, Cairo; Attendance: 100; Referees: Correa, Conberse (ARG)
6 August 2025; 17:15	1× (yellow card) 2× (suspension) 2× (red card)	Report	1× (yellow card) 3× (suspension)	New Capital Sports Hall, Cairo; Attendance: 100; Referees: Correa, Conberse (ARG)

6 August 2025; 19:30	Spain	49–19	Algeria	New Capital Sports Hall, Cairo; Attendance: 65; Referees: Cha, Pak (KOR)
6 August 2025; 19:30	Bayo 9	(26–9)	Berrou 6	New Capital Sports Hall, Cairo; Attendance: 65; Referees: Cha, Pak (KOR)
6 August 2025; 19:30	1× (suspension)	Report	6× (suspension)	New Capital Sports Hall, Cairo; Attendance: 65; Referees: Cha, Pak (KOR)

7 August 2025; 17:15	Algeria	22–32	Serbia	New Capital Sports Hall, Cairo; Attendance: 200; Referees: Pîrvu, Potîrniche (ROU)
7 August 2025; 17:15	Berrou, Hakimi 5	(8–14)	Cenić 9	New Capital Sports Hall, Cairo; Attendance: 200; Referees: Pîrvu, Potîrniche (ROU)
7 August 2025; 17:15	5× (suspension) 2× (red card)	Report	4× (suspension)	New Capital Sports Hall, Cairo; Attendance: 200; Referees: Pîrvu, Potîrniche (ROU)

7 August 2025; 19:30	Spain	38–35	Croatia	New Capital Sports Hall, Cairo; Attendance: 300; Referees: Covaliuc, Covaliuc (MDA)
7 August 2025; 19:30	Fis Ballester 10	(17–18)	Tokić 7	New Capital Sports Hall, Cairo; Attendance: 300; Referees: Covaliuc, Covaliuc (MDA)
7 August 2025; 19:30	1× (yellow card) 5× (suspension) 1× (red card)	Report	2× (suspension)	New Capital Sports Hall, Cairo; Attendance: 300; Referees: Covaliuc, Covaliuc (MDA)

9 August 2025; 17:15	Croatia	35–29	Algeria	New Capital Sports Hall, Cairo; Attendance: 150; Referees: Maia, Nunes (POR)
9 August 2025; 17:15	Begić 7	(19–12)	Berrou 9	New Capital Sports Hall, Cairo; Attendance: 150; Referees: Maia, Nunes (POR)
9 August 2025; 17:15	4× (suspension)	Report	1× (yellow card) 4× (suspension) 1× (red card)	New Capital Sports Hall, Cairo; Attendance: 150; Referees: Maia, Nunes (POR)

9 August 2025; 19:30	Serbia	24–42	Spain	New Capital Sports Hall, Cairo; Attendance: 200; Referees: El-Beltagy, Mahmoud (EGY)
9 August 2025; 19:30	Stankov 9	(15–22)	Barreto, Rocas 6	New Capital Sports Hall, Cairo; Attendance: 200; Referees: El-Beltagy, Mahmoud (EGY)
9 August 2025; 19:30	1× (yellow card) 5× (suspension)	Report	4× (suspension)	New Capital Sports Hall, Cairo; Attendance: 200; Referees: El-Beltagy, Mahmoud (EGY)

=== Group D ===
Pos	Team	Pld	W	D	L	GF	GA	GD	Pts	Qualification
1	Iceland	3	3	0	0	109	65	+44	6	Main round
2	Saudi Arabia	3	1	1	1	101	94	+7	3	Main round
3	Brazil	3	1	1	1	80	79	+1	3	President's Cup
4	Guinea	3	0	0	3	72	124	−52	0	President's Cup

Source: IHF
Rules for classification: 1) points; 2) head-to-head points; 3) head-to-head goal difference; 4) head-to-head number of goals scored; 5) goal difference.

6 August 2025; 12:45	Iceland	41–19	Guinea	New Capital Sports Hall, Cairo; Attendance: 30; Referees: Maia, Nunes (POR)
6 August 2025; 12:45	Teitsson 7	(19–8)	three players 3	New Capital Sports Hall, Cairo; Attendance: 30; Referees: Maia, Nunes (POR)
6 August 2025; 12:45	4× (suspension)	Report	3× (suspension) 1× (red card)	New Capital Sports Hall, Cairo; Attendance: 30; Referees: Maia, Nunes (POR)

6 August 2025; 15:00	Brazil	26–26	Saudi Arabia	New Capital Sports Hall, Cairo; Attendance: 150; Referees: Cheng, Zhou (CHN)
6 August 2025; 15:00	Melo 5	(15–15)	Al-Sadoon 7	New Capital Sports Hall, Cairo; Attendance: 150; Referees: Cheng, Zhou (CHN)
6 August 2025; 15:00	3× (suspension)	Report		New Capital Sports Hall, Cairo; Attendance: 150; Referees: Cheng, Zhou (CHN)

7 August 2025; 12:45	Saudi Arabia	27–43	Iceland	New Capital Sports Hall, Cairo; Attendance: 150; Referees: Correa, Conberse (ARG)
7 August 2025; 12:45	Al-Obaidi 9	(11–22)	Hjartarson 7	New Capital Sports Hall, Cairo; Attendance: 150; Referees: Correa, Conberse (ARG)
7 August 2025; 12:45	1× (yellow card) 4× (suspension) 1× (red card)	Report	1× (yellow card) 3× (suspension)	New Capital Sports Hall, Cairo; Attendance: 150; Referees: Correa, Conberse (ARG)

7 August 2025; 15:00	Brazil	35–28	Guinea	New Capital Sports Hall, Cairo; Attendance: 150; Referees: Ben Dahou, Zoghlami (TUN)
7 August 2025; 15:00	Borja, Pereira 7	(14–11)	Camara 7	New Capital Sports Hall, Cairo; Attendance: 150; Referees: Ben Dahou, Zoghlami (TUN)
7 August 2025; 15:00	6× (suspension)	Report	4× (suspension)	New Capital Sports Hall, Cairo; Attendance: 150; Referees: Ben Dahou, Zoghlami (TUN)

9 August 2025; 12:45	Guinea	25–48	Saudi Arabia	New Capital Sports Hall, Cairo; Attendance: 100; Referees: Borge, Nygren (NOR)
9 August 2025; 12:45	Diallo, Fofana 7	(12–22)	Al-Obaidi 18	New Capital Sports Hall, Cairo; Attendance: 100; Referees: Borge, Nygren (NOR)
9 August 2025; 12:45	7× (suspension) 1× (red card)	Report	4× (suspension)	New Capital Sports Hall, Cairo; Attendance: 100; Referees: Borge, Nygren (NOR)

9 August 2025; 15:00	Iceland	25–19	Brazil	New Capital Sports Hall, Cairo; Attendance: 150; Referees: Al-Enezi, Al-Nassem (KUW)
9 August 2025; 15:00	Guðmundsson 10	(12–10)	Melo, Tigre 4	New Capital Sports Hall, Cairo; Attendance: 150; Referees: Al-Enezi, Al-Nassem (KUW)
9 August 2025; 15:00	3× (suspension)	Report	1× (yellow card) 5× (suspension) 1× (red card)	New Capital Sports Hall, Cairo; Attendance: 150; Referees: Al-Enezi, Al-Nassem (KUW)

=== Group E ===
Pos	Team	Pld	W	D	L	GF	GA	GD	Pts	Qualification
1	Germany	3	2	1	0	97	75	+22	5	Main round
2	Slovenia	3	2	0	1	106	69	+37	4	Main round
3	Faroe Islands	3	1	1	1	86	83	+3	3	President's Cup
4	Uruguay	3	0	0	3	53	115	−62	0	President's Cup

Source: IHF
Rules for classification: 1) points; 2) head-to-head points; 3) head-to-head goal difference; 4) head-to-head number of goals scored; 5) goal difference.

6 August 2025; 12:45	Germany	39–22	Uruguay	Cairo Stadium Indoor Halls Complex Hall 2, Cairo; Attendance: 350; Referees: Al-Shahi, Al-Wahbi (OMA)
6 August 2025; 12:45	six players 4	(19–12)	Carpinelli 5	Cairo Stadium Indoor Halls Complex Hall 2, Cairo; Attendance: 350; Referees: Al-Shahi, Al-Wahbi (OMA)
6 August 2025; 12:45	4× (suspension)	Report	3× (suspension)	Cairo Stadium Indoor Halls Complex Hall 2, Cairo; Attendance: 350; Referees: Al-Shahi, Al-Wahbi (OMA)

6 August 2025; 15:00	Slovenia	38–25	Faroe Islands	Cairo Stadium Indoor Halls Complex Hall 2, Cairo; Attendance: 372; Referees: El-Beltagy, Mah (EGY)
6 August 2025; 15:00	Marguč 12	(19–12)	three players 5	Cairo Stadium Indoor Halls Complex Hall 2, Cairo; Attendance: 372; Referees: El-Beltagy, Mah (EGY)
6 August 2025; 15:00	6× (suspension)	Report	4× (suspension)	Cairo Stadium Indoor Halls Complex Hall 2, Cairo; Attendance: 372; Referees: El-Beltagy, Mah (EGY)

8 August 2025; 12:45	Faroe Islands	28–28	Germany	Cairo Stadium Indoor Halls Complex, Cairo; Attendance: 379; Referees: El-Saied, El-Saied (EGY)
8 August 2025; 12:45	Árnason 7	(13–15)	Schmid 5	Cairo Stadium Indoor Halls Complex, Cairo; Attendance: 379; Referees: El-Saied, El-Saied (EGY)
8 August 2025; 12:45	1× (yellow card) 3× (suspension)	Report	1× (yellow card) 6× (suspension)	Cairo Stadium Indoor Halls Complex, Cairo; Attendance: 379; Referees: El-Saied, El-Saied (EGY)

8 August 2025; 15:00	Slovenia	43–14	Uruguay	Cairo Stadium Indoor Halls Complex, Cairo; Attendance: 247; Referees: Al-Saqer, Al-Suqufi (KSA)
8 August 2025; 15:00	Marguč 9	(23–5)	López 5	Cairo Stadium Indoor Halls Complex, Cairo; Attendance: 247; Referees: Al-Saqer, Al-Suqufi (KSA)
8 August 2025; 15:00	1× (yellow card) 2× (suspension) 1× (red card)	Report	4× (suspension)	Cairo Stadium Indoor Halls Complex, Cairo; Attendance: 247; Referees: Al-Saqer, Al-Suqufi (KSA)

9 August 2025; 12:45	Uruguay	17–33	Faroe Islands	Cairo Stadium Indoor Halls Complex Hall 2, Cairo; Attendance: 323; Referees: Cheng, Zhou (CHN)
9 August 2025; 12:45	Carpinelli 7	(7–13)	Haldansen 8	Cairo Stadium Indoor Halls Complex Hall 2, Cairo; Attendance: 323; Referees: Cheng, Zhou (CHN)
9 August 2025; 12:45	1× (yellow card) 3× (suspension) 1× (red card)	Report	1× (yellow card) 4× (suspension) 1× (red card)	Cairo Stadium Indoor Halls Complex Hall 2, Cairo; Attendance: 323; Referees: Cheng, Zhou (CHN)

9 August 2025; 15:00	Germany	30–25	Slovenia	Cairo Stadium Indoor Halls Complex Hall 2, Cairo; Attendance: 264; Referees: Covaliuc, Covaliuc (MDA)
9 August 2025; 15:00	Schröder 8	(11–14)	Marguč 8	Cairo Stadium Indoor Halls Complex Hall 2, Cairo; Attendance: 264; Referees: Covaliuc, Covaliuc (MDA)
9 August 2025; 15:00	1× (suspension) 1× (red card)	Report	2× (suspension)	Cairo Stadium Indoor Halls Complex Hall 2, Cairo; Attendance: 264; Referees: Covaliuc, Covaliuc (MDA)

=== Group F ===
Pos	Team	Pld	W	D	L	GF	GA	GD	Pts	Qualification
1	Norway	3	3	0	0	122	77	+45	6	Main round
2	France	3	2	0	1	121	78	+43	4	Main round
3	Argentina	3	1	0	2	89	84	+5	2	President's Cup
4	Mexico	3	0	0	3	43	136	−93	0	President's Cup

Source: IHF
Rules for classification: 1) points; 2) head-to-head points; 3) head-to-head goal difference; 4) head-to-head number of goals scored; 5) goal difference.

6 August 2025; 17:15	Norway	29–28	Argentina	Cairo Stadium Indoor Halls Complex Hall 2, Cairo; Attendance: 476; Referees: El-Saied, El-Saied (EGY)
6 August 2025; 17:15	Bore 16	(14–14)	Torossian 10	Cairo Stadium Indoor Halls Complex Hall 2, Cairo; Attendance: 476; Referees: El-Saied, El-Saied (EGY)
6 August 2025; 17:15	1× (yellow card) 6× (suspension)	Report	1× (yellow card) 2× (suspension)	Cairo Stadium Indoor Halls Complex Hall 2, Cairo; Attendance: 476; Referees: El-Saied, El-Saied (EGY)

6 August 2025; 19:30	France	48–12	Mexico	Cairo Stadium Indoor Halls Complex Hall 2, Cairo; Attendance: 285; Referees: Al-Saqer, Al-Suqufi (KSA)
6 August 2025; 19:30	Barelle 12	(24–2)	Sánchez 3	Cairo Stadium Indoor Halls Complex Hall 2, Cairo; Attendance: 285; Referees: Al-Saqer, Al-Suqufi (KSA)
6 August 2025; 19:30	3× (suspension)	Report		Cairo Stadium Indoor Halls Complex Hall 2, Cairo; Attendance: 285; Referees: Al-Saqer, Al-Suqufi (KSA)

8 August 2025; 17:15	Mexico	15–51	Norway	Cairo Stadium Indoor Halls Complex, Cairo; Attendance: 224; Referees: Cha, Pak (KOR)
8 August 2025; 17:15	Sandoval 5	(7–23)	Tjernshaugen 16	Cairo Stadium Indoor Halls Complex, Cairo; Attendance: 224; Referees: Cha, Pak (KOR)
8 August 2025; 17:15	2× (suspension)	Report	2× (suspension)	Cairo Stadium Indoor Halls Complex, Cairo; Attendance: 224; Referees: Cha, Pak (KOR)

8 August 2025; 19:30	France	39–24	Argentina	Cairo Stadium Indoor Halls Complex, Cairo; Attendance: 347; Referees: El-Beltagy, Mahmoud (EGY)
8 August 2025; 19:30	Baradat, Thuillier 6	(18–13)	three players 4	Cairo Stadium Indoor Halls Complex, Cairo; Attendance: 347; Referees: El-Beltagy, Mahmoud (EGY)
8 August 2025; 19:30	5× (suspension)	Report	3× (suspension)	Cairo Stadium Indoor Halls Complex, Cairo; Attendance: 347; Referees: El-Beltagy, Mahmoud (EGY)

9 August 2025; 17:15	Argentina	37–16	Mexico	Cairo Stadium Indoor Halls Complex Hall 2, Cairo; Attendance: 234; Referees: Godoy, Magalhães (BRA)
9 August 2025; 17:15	Lonatti 6	(19–10)	Sánchez 5	Cairo Stadium Indoor Halls Complex Hall 2, Cairo; Attendance: 234; Referees: Godoy, Magalhães (BRA)
9 August 2025; 17:15	3× (suspension)	Report	2× (suspension)	Cairo Stadium Indoor Halls Complex Hall 2, Cairo; Attendance: 234; Referees: Godoy, Magalhães (BRA)

9 August 2025; 19:30	Norway	42–34	France	Cairo Stadium Indoor Halls Complex Hall 2, Cairo; Attendance: 243; Referees: Ben Dahou, Zoghlami (TUN)
9 August 2025; 19:30	Bore 11	(21–17)	Thuillier 8	Cairo Stadium Indoor Halls Complex Hall 2, Cairo; Attendance: 243; Referees: Ben Dahou, Zoghlami (TUN)
9 August 2025; 19:30	1× (yellow card) 3× (suspension)	Report	5× (suspension)	Cairo Stadium Indoor Halls Complex Hall 2, Cairo; Attendance: 243; Referees: Ben Dahou, Zoghlami (TUN)

=== Group G ===
Pos	Team	Pld	W	D	L	GF	GA	GD	Pts	Qualification
1	Egypt (H)	3	3	0	0	118	83	+35	6	Main round
2	Japan	3	2	0	1	94	98	−4	4	Main round
3	Bahrain	3	1	0	2	94	101	−7	2	President's Cup
4	South Korea	3	0	0	3	92	116	−24	0	President's Cup

Source: IHF
Rules for classification: 1) points; 2) head-to-head points; 3) head-to-head goal difference; 4) head-to-head number of goals scored; 5) goal difference.
(H) Hosts

6 August 2025; 17:15	Japan	32–30	Bahrain	Cairo Stadium Indoor Halls Complex, Cairo; Attendance: 600; Referees: Borge, Nygren (NOR)
6 August 2025; 17:15	Furusawa 7	(15–15)	Al-Falahi 8	Cairo Stadium Indoor Halls Complex, Cairo; Attendance: 600; Referees: Borge, Nygren (NOR)
6 August 2025; 17:15	5× (suspension) 1× (red card)	Report	4× (suspension)	Cairo Stadium Indoor Halls Complex, Cairo; Attendance: 600; Referees: Borge, Nygren (NOR)

6 August 2025; 20:00	Egypt	46–27	South Korea	Cairo Stadium Indoor Halls Complex, Cairo; Attendance: 3,500; Referees: Godoy, Magalhães (BRA)
6 August 2025; 20:00	El-Sabagh 8	(22–13)	Choi 9	Cairo Stadium Indoor Halls Complex, Cairo; Attendance: 3,500; Referees: Godoy, Magalhães (BRA)
6 August 2025; 20:00	3× (suspension)	Report	4× (suspension)	Cairo Stadium Indoor Halls Complex, Cairo; Attendance: 3,500; Referees: Godoy, Magalhães (BRA)

7 August 2025; 17:15	Japan	34–32	South Korea	Cairo Stadium Indoor Halls Complex, Cairo; Attendance: 1,300; Referees: Al-Shahi, Al-Wahbi (OMA)
7 August 2025; 17:15	Akiyoshi 7	(16–11)	Choi 9	Cairo Stadium Indoor Halls Complex, Cairo; Attendance: 1,300; Referees: Al-Shahi, Al-Wahbi (OMA)
7 August 2025; 17:15	1× (suspension)	Report	2× (suspension)	Cairo Stadium Indoor Halls Complex, Cairo; Attendance: 1,300; Referees: Al-Shahi, Al-Wahbi (OMA)

7 August 2025; 19:30	Bahrain	28–36	Egypt	Cairo Stadium Indoor Halls Complex, Cairo; Attendance: 2,500; Referees: Al-Enezi, Al-Nassem (KUW)
7 August 2025; 19:30	Al-Showaikh 10	(13–19)	Hassan, El-Etter 6	Cairo Stadium Indoor Halls Complex, Cairo; Attendance: 2,500; Referees: Al-Enezi, Al-Nassem (KUW)
7 August 2025; 19:30	2× (suspension)	Report	3× (suspension) 1× (red card)	Cairo Stadium Indoor Halls Complex, Cairo; Attendance: 2,500; Referees: Al-Enezi, Al-Nassem (KUW)

9 August 2025; 17:15	South Korea	33–36	Bahrain	Cairo Stadium Indoor Halls Complex, Cairo; Attendance: 4,000; Referees: Oyarzun, Zaragueta (ESP)
9 August 2025; 17:15	Kang 8	(13–16)	Ali 9	Cairo Stadium Indoor Halls Complex, Cairo; Attendance: 4,000; Referees: Oyarzun, Zaragueta (ESP)
9 August 2025; 17:15	1× (yellow card) 6× (suspension)	Report	6× (suspension)	Cairo Stadium Indoor Halls Complex, Cairo; Attendance: 4,000; Referees: Oyarzun, Zaragueta (ESP)

9 August 2025; 19:30	Egypt	36–28	Japan	Cairo Stadium Indoor Halls Complex, Cairo; Attendance: 7,000; Referees: Correa, Conberse (ARG)
9 August 2025; 19:30	Baraka 8	(14–18)	Ohashi 5	Cairo Stadium Indoor Halls Complex, Cairo; Attendance: 7,000; Referees: Correa, Conberse (ARG)
9 August 2025; 19:30	6× (suspension)	Report	2× (suspension)	Cairo Stadium Indoor Halls Complex, Cairo; Attendance: 7,000; Referees: Correa, Conberse (ARG)

=== Group H ===
Pos	Team	Pld	W	D	L	GF	GA	GD	Pts	Qualification
1	Denmark	3	3	0	0	107	85	+22	6	Main round
2	Czech Republic	3	2	0	1	104	97	+7	4	Main round
3	Tunisia	3	1	0	2	106	96	+10	2	President's Cup
4	United States	3	0	0	3	82	121	−39	0	President's Cup

Source: IHF
Rules for classification: 1) points; 2) head-to-head points; 3) head-to-head goal difference; 4) head-to-head number of goals scored; 5) goal difference.

6 August 2025; 12:45	Denmark	34–29	Czech Republic	Cairo Stadium Indoor Halls Complex, Cairo; Attendance: 49; Referees: Mikelić, Parađina (CRO)
6 August 2025; 12:45	Boysen 5	(15–14)	Jahoda	Cairo Stadium Indoor Halls Complex, Cairo; Attendance: 49; Referees: Mikelić, Parađina (CRO)
6 August 2025; 12:45	1× (yellow card) 1× (suspension)	Report	1× (yellow card) 5× (suspension)	Cairo Stadium Indoor Halls Complex, Cairo; Attendance: 49; Referees: Mikelić, Parađina (CRO)

6 August 2025; 15:00	Tunisia	43–26	United States	Cairo Stadium Indoor Halls Complex, Cairo; Attendance: 100; Referees: Oyarzun, Zaragueta (ESP)
6 August 2025; 15:00	Bahri 9	(24–16)	Neumaier 8	Cairo Stadium Indoor Halls Complex, Cairo; Attendance: 100; Referees: Oyarzun, Zaragueta (ESP)
6 August 2025; 15:00	1× (yellow card) 3× (suspension)	Report	2× (suspension)	Cairo Stadium Indoor Halls Complex, Cairo; Attendance: 100; Referees: Oyarzun, Zaragueta (ESP)

7 August 2025; 12:45	United States	25–36	Denmark	Cairo Stadium Indoor Halls Complex, Cairo; Attendance: 75; Referees: Cheng, Zhou (CHN)
7 August 2025; 12:45	Bengtsson 5	(10–14)	Jensen 10	Cairo Stadium Indoor Halls Complex, Cairo; Attendance: 75; Referees: Cheng, Zhou (CHN)
7 August 2025; 12:45	4× (suspension) 1× (red card)	Report	1× (yellow card) 2× (suspension)	Cairo Stadium Indoor Halls Complex, Cairo; Attendance: 75; Referees: Cheng, Zhou (CHN)

7 August 2025; 15:00	Tunisia	32–33	Czech Republic	Cairo Stadium Indoor Halls Complex, Cairo; Attendance: 100; Referees: Godoy, Magalhães (BRA)
7 August 2025; 15:00	Teber 6	(14–15)	Koníček, Skopár 7	Cairo Stadium Indoor Halls Complex, Cairo; Attendance: 100; Referees: Godoy, Magalhães (BRA)
7 August 2025; 15:00	1× (yellow card) 3× (suspension) 1× (red card)	Report	2× (yellow card) 5× (suspension) 1× (red card)	Cairo Stadium Indoor Halls Complex, Cairo; Attendance: 100; Referees: Godoy, Magalhães (BRA)

9 August 2025; 12:45	Czech Republic	42–31	United States	Cairo Stadium Indoor Halls Complex, Cairo; Attendance: 100; Referees: Al-Shahi, Al-Wahbi (OMA)
9 August 2025; 12:45	three players 7	(19–17)	Neumaier 8	Cairo Stadium Indoor Halls Complex, Cairo; Attendance: 100; Referees: Al-Shahi, Al-Wahbi (OMA)
9 August 2025; 12:45	6× (suspension)	Report	2× (suspension)	Cairo Stadium Indoor Halls Complex, Cairo; Attendance: 100; Referees: Al-Shahi, Al-Wahbi (OMA)

9 August 2025; 15:00	Denmark	37–31	Tunisia	Cairo Stadium Indoor Halls Complex, Cairo; Attendance: 100; Referees: Pîrvu, Potîrniche (ROU)
9 August 2025; 15:00	Jensen, Sørensen 6	(19–14)	Ben Fredj 6	Cairo Stadium Indoor Halls Complex, Cairo; Attendance: 100; Referees: Pîrvu, Potîrniche (ROU)
9 August 2025; 15:00	3× (suspension)	Report	1× (yellow card) 5× (suspension)	Cairo Stadium Indoor Halls Complex, Cairo; Attendance: 100; Referees: Pîrvu, Potîrniche (ROU)

== President's Cup ==
Points obtained in the matches against the team from the group are taken over.

=== Group I ===
Pos	Team	Pld	W	D	L	GF	GA	GD	Pts	Qualification
1	Portugal	3	3	0	0	109	77	+32	6	17–20th place semifinals
2	Kosovo	3	2	0	1	97	86	+11	4	21st–24th place semifinals
3	Kuwait	3	1	0	2	80	99	−19	2	25–28th place semifinals
4	Morocco	3	0	0	3	72	96	−24	0	29th–32nd place semifinals

Source: IHF
Rules for classification: 1) points; 2) head-to-head points; 3) head-to-head goal difference; 4) head-to-head number of goals scored; 5) goal difference.

11 August 2025; 12:45	Portugal	30–25	Morocco	Hassan Moustafa Sports Hall, Giza; Referees: Mikelić, Al-Suqufi, Nikolovski
11 August 2025; 12:45	Sousa 7	(19–11)	Arent-Mansour 12	Hassan Moustafa Sports Hall, Giza; Referees: Mikelić, Al-Suqufi, Nikolovski
11 August 2025; 12:45	5× (suspension)	Report	1× (yellow card) 4× (suspension)	Hassan Moustafa Sports Hall, Giza; Referees: Mikelić, Al-Suqufi, Nikolovski

11 August 2025; 15:00	Kosovo	36–23	Kuwait	Hassan Moustafa Sports Hall, Giza; Attendance: 110; Referees: Magalhães, Cheng, Reyes
11 August 2025; 15:00	Mulaj 13	(17–11)	Salmin 8	Hassan Moustafa Sports Hall, Giza; Attendance: 110; Referees: Magalhães, Cheng, Reyes
11 August 2025; 15:00	1× (yellow card) 3× (suspension) 1× (red card)	Report	7× (suspension)	Hassan Moustafa Sports Hall, Giza; Attendance: 110; Referees: Magalhães, Cheng, Reyes

12 August 2025; 12:45	Portugal	41–29	Kosovo	Hassan Moustafa Sports Hall, Giza; Attendance: 80; Referees: Zuñiga, El-Saied, Metalari
12 August 2025; 12:45	Lourenço 10	(22–11)	Muqolli 9	Hassan Moustafa Sports Hall, Giza; Attendance: 80; Referees: Zuñiga, El-Saied, Metalari
12 August 2025; 12:45	6× (suspension)	Report	3× (suspension)	Hassan Moustafa Sports Hall, Giza; Attendance: 80; Referees: Zuñiga, El-Saied, Metalari

12 August 2025; 15:00	Kuwait	34–25	Morocco	Hassan Moustafa Sports Hall, Giza; Attendance: 100; Referees: Godoy, El-Saied, Al-Saqer
12 August 2025; 15:00	H. Boland 9	(16–12)	Nouali 9	Hassan Moustafa Sports Hall, Giza; Attendance: 100; Referees: Godoy, El-Saied, Al-Saqer
12 August 2025; 15:00	2× (suspension) 2× (red card)	Report	3× (suspension)	Hassan Moustafa Sports Hall, Giza; Attendance: 100; Referees: Godoy, El-Saied, Al-Saqer

=== Group II ===
Pos	Team	Pld	W	D	L	GF	GA	GD	Pts	Qualification
1	Croatia	3	2	1	0	97	75	+22	5 (Note: Croatia 23–23 Brazil)	17–20th place semifinals
2	Brazil	3	2	1	0	94	79	+15	5	21st–24th place semifinals
3	Algeria	3	1	0	2	85	93	−8	2	25–28th place semifinals
4	Guinea	3	0	0	3	73	102	−29	0	29th–32nd place semifinals

Source: IHF
Rules for classification: 1) points; 2) head-to-head points; 3) head-to-head goal difference; 4) head-to-head number of goals scored; 5) goal difference.
Notes:

11 August 2025; 12:45	Croatia	39–23	Guinea	New Capital Sports Hall, Cairo; Attendance: 100; Referees: Mahmoud, Cha, Ben Dahou
11 August 2025; 12:45	Tomić 6	(18–14)	Bangoura 5	New Capital Sports Hall, Cairo; Attendance: 100; Referees: Mahmoud, Cha, Ben Dahou
11 August 2025; 12:45	2× (suspension) 1× (red card)	Report	6× (suspension) 1× (red card)	New Capital Sports Hall, Cairo; Attendance: 100; Referees: Mahmoud, Cha, Ben Dahou

11 August 2025; 15:00	Brazil	36–28	Algeria	New Capital Sports Hall, Cairo; Attendance: 100; Referees: Pak, Borge, Zoghlami
11 August 2025; 15:00	Oliveira 11	(16–14)	Berrou 8	New Capital Sports Hall, Cairo; Attendance: 100; Referees: Pak, Borge, Zoghlami
11 August 2025; 15:00	6× (suspension)	Report	5× (suspension) 1× (red card)	New Capital Sports Hall, Cairo; Attendance: 100; Referees: Pak, Borge, Zoghlami

12 August 2025; 12:45	Croatia	23–23	Brazil	New Capital Sports Hall, Cairo; Attendance: 100; Referees: Saleh, Pîrvu, Perdomo
12 August 2025; 12:45	Tokić 10	(12–10)	Melo 6	New Capital Sports Hall, Cairo; Attendance: 100; Referees: Saleh, Pîrvu, Perdomo
12 August 2025; 12:45	2× (suspension)	Report	1× (yellow card) 3× (suspension)	New Capital Sports Hall, Cairo; Attendance: 100; Referees: Saleh, Pîrvu, Perdomo

12 August 2025; 15:00	Algeria	28–22	Guinea	New Capital Sports Hall, Cairo; Attendance: 100; Referees: Picard, Vujačić, Al-Wahbi
12 August 2025; 15:00	Makboul 7	(14–10)	Diallo 6	New Capital Sports Hall, Cairo; Attendance: 100; Referees: Picard, Vujačić, Al-Wahbi
12 August 2025; 15:00	3× (suspension)	Report	2× (suspension)	New Capital Sports Hall, Cairo; Attendance: 100; Referees: Picard, Vujačić, Al-Wahbi

=== Group III ===
Pos	Team	Pld	W	D	L	GF	GA	GD	Pts	Qualification
1	Faroe Islands	3	2	1	0	100	59	+41	5	17–20th place semifinals
2	Argentina	3	2	1	0	94	62	+32	5	21st–24th place semifinals
3	Uruguay	3	1	0	2	73	85	−12	2	25–28th place semifinals
4	Mexico	3	0	0	3	53	114	−61	0	29th–32nd place semifinals

Source: IHF
Rules for classification: 1) points; 2) head-to-head points; 3) head-to-head goal difference; 4) head-to-head number of goals scored; 5) goal difference.

11 August 2025; 17:15	Faroe Islands	41–16	Mexico	Hassan Moustafa Sports Hall, Giza; Attendance: 110; Referees: Godoy, El-Saied, Al-Saqer
11 August 2025; 17:15	Egholm 11	(19–6)	Sandoval, Villa 4	Hassan Moustafa Sports Hall, Giza; Attendance: 110; Referees: Godoy, El-Saied, Al-Saqer
11 August 2025; 17:15	1× (yellow card) 1× (suspension)	Report	4× (suspension) 1× (red card)	Hassan Moustafa Sports Hall, Giza; Attendance: 110; Referees: Godoy, El-Saied, Al-Saqer

11 August 2025; 19:30	Argentina	31–20	Uruguay	Hassan Moustafa Sports Hall, Giza; Attendance: 150; Referees: Zuñiga, El-Saied, Metalari
11 August 2025; 19:30	La Delfa 8	(19–9)	López 5	Hassan Moustafa Sports Hall, Giza; Attendance: 150; Referees: Zuñiga, El-Saied, Metalari
11 August 2025; 19:30	1× (yellow card) 4× (suspension) 1× (red card)	Report	2× (suspension) 1× (red card)	Hassan Moustafa Sports Hall, Giza; Attendance: 150; Referees: Zuñiga, El-Saied, Metalari

12 August 2025; 17:15	Faroe Islands	26–26	Argentina	Hassan Moustafa Sports Hall, Giza; Attendance: 150; Referees: Magalhães, Mikelić, Al-Suqufi
12 August 2025; 17:15	Hammer 11	(15–14)	La Delfa 8	Hassan Moustafa Sports Hall, Giza; Attendance: 150; Referees: Magalhães, Mikelić, Al-Suqufi
12 August 2025; 17:15	1× (yellow card) 1× (suspension)	Report	2× (yellow card) 3× (suspension)	Hassan Moustafa Sports Hall, Giza; Attendance: 150; Referees: Magalhães, Mikelić, Al-Suqufi

12 August 2025; 19:30	Uruguay	36–21	Mexico	Hassan Moustafa Sports Hall, Giza; Attendance: 130; Referees: Zhou, Reyes, Nikolovski
12 August 2025; 19:30	Carpinelli 9	(19–9)	Padilla 7	Hassan Moustafa Sports Hall, Giza; Attendance: 130; Referees: Zhou, Reyes, Nikolovski
12 August 2025; 19:30	4× (suspension)	Report	5× (suspension) 1× (red card)	Hassan Moustafa Sports Hall, Giza; Attendance: 130; Referees: Zhou, Reyes, Nikolovski

=== Group IV ===
Pos	Team	Pld	W	D	L	GF	GA	GD	Pts	Qualification
1	Tunisia	3	2	1	0	113	89	+24	5	17–20th place semifinals
2	Bahrain	3	2	1	0	104	95	+9	5	21st–24th place semifinals
3	South Korea	3	1	0	2	98	102	−4	2	25–28th place semifinals
4	United States	3	0	0	3	84	113	−29	0	29th–32nd place semifinals

Source: IHF
Rules for classification: 1) points; 2) head-to-head points; 3) head-to-head goal difference; 4) head-to-head number of goals scored; 5) goal difference.

11 August 2025; 17:15	Bahrain	39–33	United States	New Capital Sports Hall, Cairo; Attendance: 100; Referees: Saleh, Zaragueta, Nunes
11 August 2025; 17:15	Ali, Eid 6	(23–13)	Neumaier 7	New Capital Sports Hall, Cairo; Attendance: 100; Referees: Saleh, Zaragueta, Nunes
11 August 2025; 17:15	5× (suspension)	Report	3× (suspension)	New Capital Sports Hall, Cairo; Attendance: 100; Referees: Saleh, Zaragueta, Nunes

11 August 2025; 19:30	Tunisia	41–34	South Korea	New Capital Sports Hall, Cairo; Attendance: 100; Referees: Oyarzun, Nygren, Maia
11 August 2025; 19:30	Jmour 9	(20–16)	Choi 10	New Capital Sports Hall, Cairo; Attendance: 100; Referees: Oyarzun, Nygren, Maia
11 August 2025; 19:30	5× (suspension)	Report	1× (yellow card) 3× (suspension)	New Capital Sports Hall, Cairo; Attendance: 100; Referees: Oyarzun, Nygren, Maia

12 August 2025; 17:15	Bahrain	29–29	Tunisia	New Capital Sports Hall, Cairo; Attendance: 100; Referees: Vauchez, Kažanegra, Araujo
12 August 2025; 17:15	Yusuf 7	(15–16)	Ben Fredj 6	New Capital Sports Hall, Cairo; Attendance: 100; Referees: Vauchez, Kažanegra, Araujo
12 August 2025; 17:15	3× (suspension)	Report	1× (yellow card) 5× (suspension)	New Capital Sports Hall, Cairo; Attendance: 100; Referees: Vauchez, Kažanegra, Araujo

12 August 2025; 19:30	South Korea	31–25	United States	New Capital Sports Hall, Cairo; Attendance: 150; Referees: Mahmoud, Al-Shahi, Potîrniche
12 August 2025; 19:30	Choi, Kim E. 7	(17–10)	Neumaier 9	New Capital Sports Hall, Cairo; Attendance: 150; Referees: Mahmoud, Al-Shahi, Potîrniche
12 August 2025; 19:30	3× (suspension)	Report	5× (suspension)	New Capital Sports Hall, Cairo; Attendance: 150; Referees: Mahmoud, Al-Shahi, Potîrniche

== Main round ==
Points obtained in the matches against the team from the group are taken over.

=== Group I ===
Pos	Team	Pld	W	D	L	GF	GA	GD	Pts	Qualification
1	Sweden	3	3	0	0	112	99	+13	6	Quarterfinals
2	Hungary	3	2	0	1	106	100	+6	4	Quarterfinals
3	Switzerland	3	1	0	2	97	108	−11	2	9–12th place semifinals
4	Austria	3	0	0	3	94	102	−8	0	13–16th place semifinals

Source: IHF
Rules for classification: 1) points; 2) head-to-head points; 3) head-to-head goal difference; 4) head-to-head number of goals scored; 5) goal difference.

11 August 2025; 12:45	Sweden	39–33	Switzerland	Cairo Stadium Indoor Halls Complex, Cairo; Attendance: 226; Referees: Kažanegra, Vujačić (MNE)
11 August 2025; 12:45	Hultberg 7	(16–18)	Mierzwa 9	Cairo Stadium Indoor Halls Complex, Cairo; Attendance: 226; Referees: Kažanegra, Vujačić (MNE)
11 August 2025; 12:45	1× (yellow card) 3× (suspension)	Report	4× (suspension)	Cairo Stadium Indoor Halls Complex, Cairo; Attendance: 226; Referees: Kažanegra, Vujačić (MNE)

11 August 2025; 15:00	Hungary	33–32	Austria	Cairo Stadium Indoor Halls Complex, Cairo; Attendance: 358; Referees: Al-Shahi, Al-Wahbi (OMA)
11 August 2025; 15:00	Eklemović 10	(16–14)	Danhel 11	Cairo Stadium Indoor Halls Complex, Cairo; Attendance: 358; Referees: Al-Shahi, Al-Wahbi (OMA)
11 August 2025; 15:00	1× (yellow card) 5× (suspension)	Report	1× (suspension)	Cairo Stadium Indoor Halls Complex, Cairo; Attendance: 358; Referees: Al-Shahi, Al-Wahbi (OMA)

12 August 2025; 12:45	Sweden	39–34	Hungary	Cairo Stadium Indoor Halls Complex, Cairo; Attendance: 100; Referees: Maia, Nunes (POR)
12 August 2025; 12:45	Roganovic 7	(22–16)	Mészáros, Szabolcs 6	Cairo Stadium Indoor Halls Complex, Cairo; Attendance: 100; Referees: Maia, Nunes (POR)
12 August 2025; 12:45	1× (suspension)	Report	3× (suspension)	Cairo Stadium Indoor Halls Complex, Cairo; Attendance: 100; Referees: Maia, Nunes (POR)

12 August 2025; 15:00	Austria	30–35	Switzerland	Cairo Stadium Indoor Halls Complex, Cairo; Attendance: 100; Referees: Oyarzun, Zaragueta (ESP)
12 August 2025; 15:00	Fritsch, Pieber 6	(13–17)	Cuencas, Mierzwa 9	Cairo Stadium Indoor Halls Complex, Cairo; Attendance: 100; Referees: Oyarzun, Zaragueta (ESP)
12 August 2025; 15:00	1× (yellow card) 4× (suspension)	Report	1× (yellow card) 4× (suspension)	Cairo Stadium Indoor Halls Complex, Cairo; Attendance: 100; Referees: Oyarzun, Zaragueta (ESP)

=== Group II ===
Pos	Team	Pld	W	D	L	GF	GA	GD	Pts	Qualification
1	Spain	3	2	0	1	110	81	+29	4 (Note: Spain 2 Pts, +17 GD; Iceland 2 pts, 0 GD; Serbia 2 Pts, −17 GD.)	Quarterfinals
2	Iceland	3	2	0	1	103	87	+16	4	Quarterfinals
3	Serbia	3	2	0	1	85	99	−14	4	9–12th place semifinals
4	Saudi Arabia	3	0	0	3	81	112	−31	0	13–16th place semifinals

Source: IHF
Rules for classification: 1) points; 2) head-to-head points; 3) head-to-head goal difference; 4) head-to-head number of goals scored; 5) goal difference.
Notes:

11 August 2025; 17:15	Spain	37–25	Saudi Arabia	Cairo Stadium Indoor Halls Complex Hall 2, Cairo; Attendance: 238; Referees: Picard, Vauchez (FRA)
11 August 2025; 17:15	Fis Ballester, Vila López 6	(23–10)	Baydhi 6	Cairo Stadium Indoor Halls Complex Hall 2, Cairo; Attendance: 238; Referees: Picard, Vauchez (FRA)
11 August 2025; 17:15	6× (suspension)	Report	4× (suspension)	Cairo Stadium Indoor Halls Complex Hall 2, Cairo; Attendance: 238; Referees: Picard, Vauchez (FRA)

11 August 2025; 19:30	Iceland	28–29	Serbia	Cairo Stadium Indoor Halls Complex Hall 2, Cairo; Attendance: 100; Referees: Covaliuc, Covaliuc (MDA)
11 August 2025; 19:30	Heimisson, Hjartarson 7	(14–17)	Stanković 7	Cairo Stadium Indoor Halls Complex Hall 2, Cairo; Attendance: 100; Referees: Covaliuc, Covaliuc (MDA)
11 August 2025; 19:30	1× (yellow card) 4× (suspension) 1× (red card)	Report	4× (suspension)	Cairo Stadium Indoor Halls Complex Hall 2, Cairo; Attendance: 100; Referees: Covaliuc, Covaliuc (MDA)

12 August 2025; 17:15	Spain	31–32	Iceland	Cairo Stadium Indoor Halls Complex Hall 2, Cairo; Attendance: 376; Referees: Ismoilov, Ismoilov (UZB)
12 August 2025; 17:15	Vila López 6	(15–15)	Guðmundsson 9	Cairo Stadium Indoor Halls Complex Hall 2, Cairo; Attendance: 376; Referees: Ismoilov, Ismoilov (UZB)
12 August 2025; 17:15	4× (suspension)	Report	3× (suspension) 1× (red card)	Cairo Stadium Indoor Halls Complex Hall 2, Cairo; Attendance: 376; Referees: Ismoilov, Ismoilov (UZB)

12 August 2025; 19:30	Serbia	32–29	Saudi Arabia	Cairo Stadium Indoor Halls Complex Hall 2, Cairo; Attendance: 234; Referees: Cha, Pak (KOR)
12 August 2025; 19:30	Cenić 8	(16–14)	Al-Obaidi 9	Cairo Stadium Indoor Halls Complex Hall 2, Cairo; Attendance: 234; Referees: Cha, Pak (KOR)
12 August 2025; 19:30	5× (suspension)	Report	2× (yellow card) 6× (suspension)	Cairo Stadium Indoor Halls Complex Hall 2, Cairo; Attendance: 234; Referees: Cha, Pak (KOR)

=== Group III ===
Pos	Team	Pld	W	D	L	GF	GA	GD	Pts	Qualification
1	Germany	3	3	0	0	83	70	+13	6	Quarterfinals
2	Norway	3	1	1	1	103	98	+5	3	Quarterfinals
3	France	3	1	0	2	92	100	−8	2	9–12th place semifinals
4	Slovenia	3	0	1	2	94	104	−10	1	13–16th place semifinals

Source: IHF
Rules for classification: 1) points; 2) head-to-head points; 3) head-to-head goal difference; 4) head-to-head number of goals scored; 5) goal difference.

11 August 2025; 12:45	Germany	26–21	France	Cairo Stadium Indoor Halls Complex Hall 2, Cairo; Attendance: 252; Referees: Correa, Conberse (ARG)
11 August 2025; 12:45	Ankermann 5	(16–7)	Barelle, Peyrabout 5	Cairo Stadium Indoor Halls Complex Hall 2, Cairo; Attendance: 252; Referees: Correa, Conberse (ARG)
11 August 2025; 12:45	3× (suspension)	Report	4× (suspension)	Cairo Stadium Indoor Halls Complex Hall 2, Cairo; Attendance: 252; Referees: Correa, Conberse (ARG)

11 August 2025; 15:00	Norway	37–37	Slovenia	Cairo Stadium Indoor Halls Complex Hall 2, Cairo; Attendance: 212; Referees: Pîrvu, Potîrniche (ROU)
11 August 2025; 15:00	Bore 12	(19–18)	Anžič 23	Cairo Stadium Indoor Halls Complex Hall 2, Cairo; Attendance: 212; Referees: Pîrvu, Potîrniche (ROU)
11 August 2025; 15:00	2× (suspension)	Report	1× (yellow card) 3× (suspension)	Cairo Stadium Indoor Halls Complex Hall 2, Cairo; Attendance: 212; Referees: Pîrvu, Potîrniche (ROU)

12 August 2025; 12:45	Germany	27–24	Norway	Cairo Stadium Indoor Halls Complex Hall 2, Cairo; Attendance: 232; Referees: Covaliuc, Covaliuc (MDA)
12 August 2025; 12:45	Grüner 7	(10–10)	Bore 10	Cairo Stadium Indoor Halls Complex Hall 2, Cairo; Attendance: 232; Referees: Covaliuc, Covaliuc (MDA)
12 August 2025; 12:45	2× (suspension)	Report	1× (yellow card) 4× (suspension)	Cairo Stadium Indoor Halls Complex Hall 2, Cairo; Attendance: 232; Referees: Covaliuc, Covaliuc (MDA)

12 August 2025; 15:00	Slovenia	32–37	France	Cairo Stadium Indoor Halls Complex Hall 2, Cairo; Attendance: 328; Referees: El-Beltagy, Mahmoud (EGY)
12 August 2025; 15:00	Marguč 10	(18–21)	Peyrabout 8	Cairo Stadium Indoor Halls Complex Hall 2, Cairo; Attendance: 328; Referees: El-Beltagy, Mahmoud (EGY)
12 August 2025; 15:00	3× (suspension)	Report	4× (suspension)	Cairo Stadium Indoor Halls Complex Hall 2, Cairo; Attendance: 328; Referees: El-Beltagy, Mahmoud (EGY)

=== Group IV ===
Pos	Team	Pld	W	D	L	GF	GA	GD	Pts	Qualification
1	Denmark	3	2	1	0	101	83	+18	5	Quarterfinals
2	Egypt (H)	3	1	2	0	100	92	+8	4	Quarterfinals
3	Czech Republic	3	1	1	1	106	96	+10	3	9–12th place semifinals
4	Japan	3	0	0	3	80	116	−36	0	13–16th place semifinals

Source: IHF
Rules for classification: 1) points; 2) head-to-head points; 3) head-to-head goal difference; 4) head-to-head number of goals scored; 5) goal difference.
(H) Hosts

11 August 2025; 17:15	Denmark	38–25	Japan	Cairo Stadium Indoor Halls Complex, Cairo; Attendance: 3,000; Referees: Araújo, Perdomo (URU)
11 August 2025; 17:15	Kjargaard 6	(19–11)	Furusawa 5	Cairo Stadium Indoor Halls Complex, Cairo; Attendance: 3,000; Referees: Araújo, Perdomo (URU)
11 August 2025; 17:15	1× (suspension)	Report	2× (suspension)	Cairo Stadium Indoor Halls Complex, Cairo; Attendance: 3,000; Referees: Araújo, Perdomo (URU)

11 August 2025; 19:30	Egypt	35–35	Czech Republic	Cairo Stadium Indoor Halls Complex, Cairo; Attendance: 8,000; Referees: Ismoilov, Ismoilov (UZB)
11 August 2025; 19:30	Abdalla 8	(17–20)	Skopár 10	Cairo Stadium Indoor Halls Complex, Cairo; Attendance: 8,000; Referees: Ismoilov, Ismoilov (UZB)
11 August 2025; 19:30	3× (suspension) 2× (red card)	Report	1× (yellow card) 4× (suspension) 1× (red card)	Cairo Stadium Indoor Halls Complex, Cairo; Attendance: 8,000; Referees: Ismoilov, Ismoilov (UZB)

12 August 2025; 17:15	Japan	27–42	Czech Republic	Cairo Stadium Indoor Halls Complex, Cairo; Attendance: 3,000; Referees: Al-Enezi, Al-Nassem (KUW)
12 August 2025; 17:15	Furusawa 6	(12–19)	Vomáčka 7	Cairo Stadium Indoor Halls Complex, Cairo; Attendance: 3,000; Referees: Al-Enezi, Al-Nassem (KUW)
12 August 2025; 17:15	3× (suspension)	Report	1× (suspension)	Cairo Stadium Indoor Halls Complex, Cairo; Attendance: 3,000; Referees: Al-Enezi, Al-Nassem (KUW)

12 August 2025; 19:30	Egypt	29–29	Denmark	Cairo Stadium Indoor Halls Complex, Cairo; Attendance: 14,000; Referees: Correa, Conberse (ARG)
12 August 2025; 19:30	Laoloua 8	(14–17)	Sørensen 7	Cairo Stadium Indoor Halls Complex, Cairo; Attendance: 14,000; Referees: Correa, Conberse (ARG)
12 August 2025; 19:30	2× (suspension) 1× (red card)	Report	1× (yellow card) 6× (suspension)	Cairo Stadium Indoor Halls Complex, Cairo; Attendance: 14,000; Referees: Correa, Conberse (ARG)

== Placement matches ==
=== 29th place bracket ===
29th–32nd place semifinals
14 August
Morocco	36
Mexico	29
14 August
Guinea	32
United States	25

29th place game
15 August
Morocco	29
Guinea	32
31st place game
15 August
Mexico	20
United States	30

==== 29th–32nd place semifinals ====
14 August 2025; 12:45	Morocco	36–29	Mexico	Hassan Moustafa Sports Hall, Giza; Referees: Cheng, Zhou (CHN)
14 August 2025; 12:45	Ayoub 7	(20–13)	Villa 8	Hassan Moustafa Sports Hall, Giza; Referees: Cheng, Zhou (CHN)
14 August 2025; 12:45	6× (suspension)	Report	1× (suspension)	Hassan Moustafa Sports Hall, Giza; Referees: Cheng, Zhou (CHN)

14 August 2025; 12:45	Guinea	32–25	United States	New Capital Sports Hall, Cairo; Attendance: 157; Referees: Cha, Pak (KOR)
14 August 2025; 12:45	Loua 8	(15–14)	Alcover 6	New Capital Sports Hall, Cairo; Attendance: 157; Referees: Cha, Pak (KOR)
14 August 2025; 12:45	2× (suspension) 1× (red card)	Report	1× (suspension) 1× (red card)	New Capital Sports Hall, Cairo; Attendance: 157; Referees: Cha, Pak (KOR)

==== 31st place game ====
15 August 2025; 12:45	Mexico	20–30	United States	New Capital Sports Hall, Cairo; Attendance: 100; Referees: El-Beltagy, Mahmoud (EGY)
15 August 2025; 12:45	Guerra, Sandoval 4	(12–12)	Neumaier 6	New Capital Sports Hall, Cairo; Attendance: 100; Referees: El-Beltagy, Mahmoud (EGY)
15 August 2025; 12:45	2× (suspension)	Report	3× (suspension)	New Capital Sports Hall, Cairo; Attendance: 100; Referees: El-Beltagy, Mahmoud (EGY)

==== 29th place game ====
15 August 2025; 12:45	Morocco	29–32	Guinea	Hassan Moustafa Sports Hall, Giza; Attendance: 70; Referees: Al-Saqer, Al-Suqufi (KSA)
15 August 2025; 12:45	El Hammoumi 7	(12–17)	Loua 9	Hassan Moustafa Sports Hall, Giza; Attendance: 70; Referees: Al-Saqer, Al-Suqufi (KSA)
15 August 2025; 12:45	1× (suspension)	Report	3× (suspension)	Hassan Moustafa Sports Hall, Giza; Attendance: 70; Referees: Al-Saqer, Al-Suqufi (KSA)

=== 25th place bracket ===
25–28th place semifinals
14 August
Kuwait	35
Uruguay	25
14 August
Algeria	28
South Korea	32

25th place game
15 August
Kuwait	26
South Korea	29
27th place game
15 August
Uruguay	27
Algeria	32

==== 25–28th place semifinals ====
14 August 2025; 15:00	Kuwait	35–25	Uruguay	Hassan Moustafa Sports Hall, Giza; Attendance: 110; Referees: Metalari, Nikolovski (MKD)
14 August 2025; 15:00	Madwah 9	(18–13)	Fernández, Soria 4	Hassan Moustafa Sports Hall, Giza; Attendance: 110; Referees: Metalari, Nikolovski (MKD)
14 August 2025; 15:00	1× (yellow card) 6× (suspension)	Report	5× (suspension)	Hassan Moustafa Sports Hall, Giza; Attendance: 110; Referees: Metalari, Nikolovski (MKD)

14 August 2025; 15:00	Algeria	28–32	South Korea	New Capital Sports Hall, Cairo; Attendance: 100; Referees: Godoy, Magalhães (BRA)
14 August 2025; 15:00	Makboul 7	(10–15)	Choi 7	New Capital Sports Hall, Cairo; Attendance: 100; Referees: Godoy, Magalhães (BRA)
14 August 2025; 15:00	1× (yellow card) 2× (suspension)	Report	1× (yellow card) 2× (suspension)	New Capital Sports Hall, Cairo; Attendance: 100; Referees: Godoy, Magalhães (BRA)

==== 27th place game ====
15 August 2025; 15:00	Uruguay	27–32	Algeria	New Capital Sports Hall, Cairo; Attendance: 200; Referees: Borge, Nygren (NOR)
15 August 2025; 15:00	González 9	(19–14)	Berrou 11	New Capital Sports Hall, Cairo; Attendance: 200; Referees: Borge, Nygren (NOR)
15 August 2025; 15:00	1× (yellow card) 3× (suspension)	Report	1× (yellow card) 7× (suspension) 1× (red card)	New Capital Sports Hall, Cairo; Attendance: 200; Referees: Borge, Nygren (NOR)

==== 25th place game ====
15 August 2025; 15:00	Kuwait	26–29	South Korea	Hassan Moustafa Sports Hall, Giza; Attendance: 110; Referees: Cheng, Zhou (CHN)
15 August 2025; 15:00	Madwah 9	(7–12)	Jung 7	Hassan Moustafa Sports Hall, Giza; Attendance: 110; Referees: Cheng, Zhou (CHN)
15 August 2025; 15:00	4× (suspension)	Report	4× (suspension)	Hassan Moustafa Sports Hall, Giza; Attendance: 110; Referees: Cheng, Zhou (CHN)

=== 21st place bracket ===
21st–24th place semifinals
14 August
Kosovo	22
Argentina	32
14 August
Brazil	33
Bahrain	25

21st place game
15 August
Argentina	20 (4)
Brazil (Pen)	20 (5)
23rd place game
15 August
Kosovo	29 (2)
Bahrain (Pen)	29 (4)

==== 21st–24th place semifinals ====
14 August 2025; 17:15	Kosovo	22–32	Argentina	Hassan Moustafa Sports Hall, Giza; Attendance: 95; Referees: Al-Saqer, Al-Suqufi (KSA)
14 August 2025; 17:15	Pajaziti 11	(9–20)	Bus 7	Hassan Moustafa Sports Hall, Giza; Attendance: 95; Referees: Al-Saqer, Al-Suqufi (KSA)
14 August 2025; 17:15	1× (yellow card) 7× (suspension) 2× (red card)	Report	4× (suspension)	Hassan Moustafa Sports Hall, Giza; Attendance: 95; Referees: Al-Saqer, Al-Suqufi (KSA)

14 August 2025; 17:15	Brazil	33–25	Bahrain	New Capital Sports Hall, Cairo; Attendance: 140; Referees: Pîrvu, Potîrniche (ROU)
14 August 2025; 17:15	Melo, Oliveira 6	(14–13)	Ali 6	New Capital Sports Hall, Cairo; Attendance: 140; Referees: Pîrvu, Potîrniche (ROU)
14 August 2025; 17:15	1× (yellow card) 5× (suspension)	Report	4× (suspension)	New Capital Sports Hall, Cairo; Attendance: 140; Referees: Pîrvu, Potîrniche (ROU)

==== 23rd place game ====
15 August 2025
17:15
Kosovo
29–29
Bahrain
New Capital Sports Hall, Cairo
Attendance: 100
Referees: Godoy, Magalhães (ARG)
Pajaziti 8
(14–18)
Ali, Yusuf 6
1× (red card)
Report
1× (suspension)

FT: 29–29 Pen: 2–4

==== 21st place game ====
15 August 2025
17:15
Argentina
20–20
Brazil
Hassan Moustafa Sports Hall, Giza
Attendance: 120
Referees: Metalari, Nikolovski (MKD)
Torossian 10
(5–8)
Oliveira 6
3× (suspension)
Report
1× (yellow card) 8× (suspension) 1× (red card)

FT: 20–20 Pen: 4–5

=== 17th place bracket ===
17–20th place semifinals
14 August
Portugal	39
Faroe Islands	28
14 August
Croatia	36
Tunisia	30

17th place game
15 August
Portugal	33
Croatia	30
19th place game
15 August
Faroe Islands	32
Tunisia	28

==== 17–20th place semifinals ====
14 August 2025; 19:30	Portugal	39–28	Faroe Islands	Hassan Moustafa Sports Hall, Giza; Attendance: 120; Referees: El-Saied, El-Saied (EGY)
14 August 2025; 19:30	Lourenço 11	(17–17)	Rasmussen 7	Hassan Moustafa Sports Hall, Giza; Attendance: 120; Referees: El-Saied, El-Saied (EGY)
14 August 2025; 19:30	7× (suspension)	Report	1× (yellow card) 6× (suspension)	Hassan Moustafa Sports Hall, Giza; Attendance: 120; Referees: El-Saied, El-Saied (EGY)

14 August 2025; 19:30	Croatia	36–30	Tunisia	New Capital Sports Hall, Cairo; Attendance: 150; Referees: Oyarzun, Zaragueta (ESP)
14 August 2025; 19:30	Begić, Moslavac 8	(15–16)	Teber 8	New Capital Sports Hall, Cairo; Attendance: 150; Referees: Oyarzun, Zaragueta (ESP)
14 August 2025; 19:30	4× (suspension) 1× (red card)	Report	4× (suspension)	New Capital Sports Hall, Cairo; Attendance: 150; Referees: Oyarzun, Zaragueta (ESP)

==== 19th place game ====
15 August 2025; 19:30	Faroe Islands	32–28	Tunisia	New Capital Sports Hall, Cairo; Attendance: 333; Referees: Cha, Pak (KOR)
15 August 2025; 19:30	Egholm 10	(12–13)	Ben Fredj 6	New Capital Sports Hall, Cairo; Attendance: 333; Referees: Cha, Pak (KOR)
15 August 2025; 19:30	2× (suspension) 1× (red card)	Report	1× (yellow card) 1× (suspension)	New Capital Sports Hall, Cairo; Attendance: 333; Referees: Cha, Pak (KOR)

==== 17th place game ====
15 August 2025; 19:30	Portugal	33–30	Croatia	Hassan Moustafa Sports Hall, Giza; Referees: Reyes, Zuñiga (CUB)
15 August 2025; 19:30	Magalhães 9	(19–14)	Tokić 9	Hassan Moustafa Sports Hall, Giza; Referees: Reyes, Zuñiga (CUB)
15 August 2025; 19:30	4× (suspension)	Report	5× (suspension) 1× (red card)	Hassan Moustafa Sports Hall, Giza; Referees: Reyes, Zuñiga (CUB)

=== 13–16th place bracket ===
13–16th place semifinals
14 August
Austria	31
Slovenia	37
14 August
Saudi Arabia	25
Japan	27

13th place game
15 August
Slovenia	41
Japan	35
15th place game
15 August
Austria (Pen)	31 (4)
Saudi Arabia	31 (3)

==== 13–16th place semifinals ====
14 August 2025; 12:30	Austria	31–37	Slovenia	Cairo Stadium Indoor Halls Complex Hall 2, Cairo; Attendance: 138; Referees: Ben Dahou, Zoghlami (TUN)
14 August 2025; 12:30	Tikvić 7	(18–21)	Marguč 14	Cairo Stadium Indoor Halls Complex Hall 2, Cairo; Attendance: 138; Referees: Ben Dahou, Zoghlami (TUN)
14 August 2025; 12:30	3× (suspension) 1× (red card)	Report	3× (suspension)	Cairo Stadium Indoor Halls Complex Hall 2, Cairo; Attendance: 138; Referees: Ben Dahou, Zoghlami (TUN)

14 August 2025; 12:30	Saudi Arabia	25–27	Japan	Cairo Stadium Indoor Halls Complex, Cairo; Attendance: 265; Referees: Kažanegra, Vujačić (MNE)
14 August 2025; 12:30	Al-Sadoon 7	(11–14)	Ishihara 7	Cairo Stadium Indoor Halls Complex, Cairo; Attendance: 265; Referees: Kažanegra, Vujačić (MNE)
14 August 2025; 12:30	5× (suspension)	Report	1× (yellow card) 2× (suspension)	Cairo Stadium Indoor Halls Complex, Cairo; Attendance: 265; Referees: Kažanegra, Vujačić (MNE)

==== 15th place game ====
15 August 2025
12:30
Austria
31–31
Saudi Arabia
Cairo Stadium Indoor Halls Complex Hall 2, Cairo
Attendance: 356
Referees: Picard, Vauchez (FRA)
Danhel, Gaydusek 6
(18–17)
Al-Obaidi 10
1× (yellow card) 1× (suspension)
Report
1× (suspension)

FT: 31–31 Pen: 4–3

==== 13th place game ====
15 August 2025; 12:30	Slovenia	41–35	Japan	Cairo Stadium Indoor Halls Complex, Cairo; Attendance: 100; Referees: Al-Enezi, Al-Nassem (KUW)
15 August 2025; 12:30	Anžič 12	(19–17)	Ohashi 6	Cairo Stadium Indoor Halls Complex, Cairo; Attendance: 100; Referees: Al-Enezi, Al-Nassem (KUW)
15 August 2025; 12:30	2× (suspension)	Report	2× (suspension)	Cairo Stadium Indoor Halls Complex, Cairo; Attendance: 100; Referees: Al-Enezi, Al-Nassem (KUW)

=== 9–12th place bracket ===
9–12th place semifinals
14 August
Switzerland	28
France	37
14 August
Serbia	35
Czech Republic	29

Ninth place game
15 August
France	42
Serbia	33
Eleventh place game
15 August
Switzerland	34
Czech Republic	29

==== 9–12th place semifinals ====
14 August 2025; 14:45	Switzerland	28–37	France	Cairo Stadium Indoor Halls Complex Hall 2, Cairo; Attendance: 243; Referees: Al-Enezi, Al-Nassem (KUW)
14 August 2025; 14:45	Mierzwa 10	(16–21)	Barelle 10	Cairo Stadium Indoor Halls Complex Hall 2, Cairo; Attendance: 243; Referees: Al-Enezi, Al-Nassem (KUW)
14 August 2025; 14:45	2× (suspension)	Report	1× (yellow card) 4× (suspension)	Cairo Stadium Indoor Halls Complex Hall 2, Cairo; Attendance: 243; Referees: Al-Enezi, Al-Nassem (KUW)

14 August 2025; 14:45	Serbia	35–29	Czech Republic	Cairo Stadium Indoor Halls Complex, Cairo; Attendance: 867; Referees: Araújo, Perdomo (URU)
14 August 2025; 14:45	Draško, Stankov 9	(17–13)	Vomáčka 9	Cairo Stadium Indoor Halls Complex, Cairo; Attendance: 867; Referees: Araújo, Perdomo (URU)
14 August 2025; 14:45	1× (yellow card) 5× (suspension)	Report	5× (suspension)	Cairo Stadium Indoor Halls Complex, Cairo; Attendance: 867; Referees: Araújo, Perdomo (URU)

==== 11th place game ====
15 August 2025; 14:45	Switzerland	34–29	Czech Republic	Cairo Stadium Indoor Halls Complex Hall 2, Cairo; Attendance: 355; Referees: Ben Dahou, Zoghlami (TUN)
15 August 2025; 14:45	Mierzwa 8	(17–12)	Jahoda 7	Cairo Stadium Indoor Halls Complex Hall 2, Cairo; Attendance: 355; Referees: Ben Dahou, Zoghlami (TUN)
15 August 2025; 14:45	4× (suspension)	Report	4× (suspension)	Cairo Stadium Indoor Halls Complex Hall 2, Cairo; Attendance: 355; Referees: Ben Dahou, Zoghlami (TUN)

==== Ninth place game ====
15 August 2025; 14:45	France	42–33	Serbia	Cairo Stadium Indoor Halls Complex, Cairo; Attendance: 150; Referees: Al-Shahi, Al-Wahbi (OMA)
15 August 2025; 14:45	Peyrabout 9	(26–19)	Draško 8	Cairo Stadium Indoor Halls Complex, Cairo; Attendance: 150; Referees: Al-Shahi, Al-Wahbi (OMA)
15 August 2025; 14:45	3× (suspension)	Report	1× (yellow card) 4× (suspension)	Cairo Stadium Indoor Halls Complex, Cairo; Attendance: 150; Referees: Al-Shahi, Al-Wahbi (OMA)

== Knockout stage ==
=== Bracket ===
Championship bracket

Quarter-finals
14 August
Sweden	35
Norway	34
14 August
Spain	31
Egypt	29
14 August
Germany	32
Hungary	31
14 August
Denmark	32
Iceland	30

Semi-finals
15 August
Sweden	30
Spain	33
15 August
Germany	32
Denmark	30

Final
17 August
Spain	36 (4)
Germany (Pen)	36 (5)
Third place
17 August
Sweden	31
Denmark	33

5–8th place bracket

5–8th place semifinals
15 August
Norway	26
Egypt	47
15 August
Hungary	36
Iceland	37

Fifth place game
17 August
Egypt	33
Iceland	31
Seventh place
17 August
Norway	34
Hungary	42

=== Quarterfinals ===
14 August 2025; 17:00	Sweden	35–34	Norway	Cairo Stadium Indoor Halls Complex Hall 2, Cairo; Attendance: 422; Referees: Ismoilov, Ismoilov (UZB)
14 August 2025; 17:00	Roganovic 9	(16–17)	Eggum 11	Cairo Stadium Indoor Halls Complex Hall 2, Cairo; Attendance: 422; Referees: Ismoilov, Ismoilov (UZB)
14 August 2025; 17:00	3× (suspension)	Report	2× (suspension)	Cairo Stadium Indoor Halls Complex Hall 2, Cairo; Attendance: 422; Referees: Ismoilov, Ismoilov (UZB)

14 August 2025; 17:00	Denmark	32–30	Iceland	Cairo Stadium Indoor Halls Complex, Cairo; Attendance: 9,000; Referees: El-Beltagy, Mahmoud (EGY)
14 August 2025; 17:00	Boysen, Hansen 6	(12–17)	Guðmundsson, Sindrason 8	Cairo Stadium Indoor Halls Complex, Cairo; Attendance: 9,000; Referees: El-Beltagy, Mahmoud (EGY)
14 August 2025; 17:00	3× (suspension) 1× (red card)	Report	1× (yellow card) 4× (suspension)	Cairo Stadium Indoor Halls Complex, Cairo; Attendance: 9,000; Referees: El-Beltagy, Mahmoud (EGY)

14 August 2025; 19:30	Spain	31–29	Egypt	Cairo Stadium Indoor Halls Complex, Cairo; Attendance: 16,000; Referees: Covaliuc, Covaliuc (MDA)
14 August 2025; 19:30	Fis Ballester 13	(13–15)	Ibrahim 5	Cairo Stadium Indoor Halls Complex, Cairo; Attendance: 16,000; Referees: Covaliuc, Covaliuc (MDA)
14 August 2025; 19:30	1× (yellow card) 1× (suspension)	Report	2× (suspension)	Cairo Stadium Indoor Halls Complex, Cairo; Attendance: 16,000; Referees: Covaliuc, Covaliuc (MDA)

14 August 2025; 19:30	Germany	32–31	Hungary	Cairo Stadium Indoor Halls Complex Hall 2, Cairo; Attendance: 266; Referees: Borge, Nygren (NOR)
14 August 2025; 19:30	Grüner 7	(15–14)	Eklemović 7	Cairo Stadium Indoor Halls Complex Hall 2, Cairo; Attendance: 266; Referees: Borge, Nygren (NOR)
14 August 2025; 19:30	1× (yellow card) 6× (suspension)	Report	1× (yellow card) 4× (suspension)	Cairo Stadium Indoor Halls Complex Hall 2, Cairo; Attendance: 266; Referees: Borge, Nygren (NOR)

=== 5–8th place semifinals ===
15 August 2025; 17:00	Norway	26–47	Egypt	Cairo Stadium Indoor Halls Complex, Cairo; Attendance: 1,200; Referees: Araújo, Perdomo (URU)
15 August 2025; 17:00	Aasberg-Andreassen 5	(14–23)	Abdalla 9	Cairo Stadium Indoor Halls Complex, Cairo; Attendance: 1,200; Referees: Araújo, Perdomo (URU)
15 August 2025; 17:00	2× (suspension)	Report	2× (yellow card) 3× (suspension)	Cairo Stadium Indoor Halls Complex, Cairo; Attendance: 1,200; Referees: Araújo, Perdomo (URU)

15 August 2025; 19:30	Hungary	36–37	Iceland	Cairo Stadium Indoor Halls Complex Hall 2, Cairo; Attendance: 183; Referees: Oyarzun, Zaragueta (ESP)
15 August 2025; 19:30	Eklemović 10	(17–17)	Baldvinsson 9	Cairo Stadium Indoor Halls Complex Hall 2, Cairo; Attendance: 183; Referees: Oyarzun, Zaragueta (ESP)
15 August 2025; 19:30	2× (suspension)	Report	3× (suspension)	Cairo Stadium Indoor Halls Complex Hall 2, Cairo; Attendance: 183; Referees: Oyarzun, Zaragueta (ESP)

=== Semifinals ===
15 August 2025; 17:15	Sweden	30–33	Spain	Cairo Stadium Indoor Halls Complex Hall 2, Cairo; Attendance: 527; Referees: Maia, Nunes (POR)
15 August 2025; 17:15	Hultberg 8	(18–18)	Fis Ballester 7	Cairo Stadium Indoor Halls Complex Hall 2, Cairo; Attendance: 527; Referees: Maia, Nunes (POR)
15 August 2025; 17:15	3× (suspension)	Report	4× (suspension)	Cairo Stadium Indoor Halls Complex Hall 2, Cairo; Attendance: 527; Referees: Maia, Nunes (POR)

15 August 2025; 19:30	Germany	32–30	Denmark	Cairo Stadium Indoor Halls Complex, Cairo; Attendance: 850; Referees: Correa, Conberse (ARG)
15 August 2025; 19:30	three players 4	(17–12)	three players 5	Cairo Stadium Indoor Halls Complex, Cairo; Attendance: 850; Referees: Correa, Conberse (ARG)
15 August 2025; 19:30	5× (suspension)	Report	3× (suspension)	Cairo Stadium Indoor Halls Complex, Cairo; Attendance: 850; Referees: Correa, Conberse (ARG)

=== Seventh place game ===
17 August 2025; 12:30	Norway	34–42	Hungary	Cairo Stadium Indoor Halls Complex, Cairo; Attendance: 250; Referees: Al-Enezi, Al-Nassem (KUW)
17 August 2025; 12:30	Gautestad 10	(17–19)	Eklemović, Horváth-Garaba 8	Cairo Stadium Indoor Halls Complex, Cairo; Attendance: 250; Referees: Al-Enezi, Al-Nassem (KUW)
17 August 2025; 12:30	4× (suspension) 2× (red card)	Report	2× (suspension) 1× (red card)	Cairo Stadium Indoor Halls Complex, Cairo; Attendance: 250; Referees: Al-Enezi, Al-Nassem (KUW)

=== Fifth place game ===
17 August 2025; 14:45	Egypt	33–31	Iceland	Cairo Stadium Indoor Halls Complex, Cairo; Attendance: 4,000; Referees: Araújo, Perdomo (URU)
17 August 2025; 14:45	Abdalla 6	(12–17)	Heimisson 9	Cairo Stadium Indoor Halls Complex, Cairo; Attendance: 4,000; Referees: Araújo, Perdomo (URU)
17 August 2025; 14:45	3× (suspension)	Report	1× (yellow card) 4× (suspension)	Cairo Stadium Indoor Halls Complex, Cairo; Attendance: 4,000; Referees: Araújo, Perdomo (URU)

=== Third place game ===
17 August 2025; 17:00	Sweden	31–33	Denmark	Cairo Stadium Indoor Halls Complex, Cairo; Attendance: 2,000; Referees: El-Beltagy, Mahmoud (EGY)
17 August 2025; 17:00	Roganovic 9	(13–14)	Sørensen 10	Cairo Stadium Indoor Halls Complex, Cairo; Attendance: 2,000; Referees: El-Beltagy, Mahmoud (EGY)
17 August 2025; 17:00	1× (yellow card) 2× (suspension) 1× (red card)	Report	1× (yellow card) 3× (suspension)	Cairo Stadium Indoor Halls Complex, Cairo; Attendance: 2,000; Referees: El-Beltagy, Mahmoud (EGY)

=== Final ===
17 August 2025
19:30
Spain
36–36 (ET)
Germany
Cairo Stadium Indoor Halls Complex, Cairo
Attendance: 4,500
Referees: Ismoilov, Ismoilov (UZB)
Fis Ballester 9
(16–14)
Grüner 9
2× (suspension)
Report
4× (suspension)

FT: 27–27 ET: 4–4, 5–5 Pen: 4–5

== Final ranking ==
Rank	Team
1st place, gold medalist(s)	Germany
2nd place, silver medalist(s)	Spain
3rd place, bronze medalist(s)	Denmark
4	Sweden
5	Egypt
6	Iceland
7	Hungary
8	Norway
9	France
10	Serbia
11	Switzerland
12	Czech Republic
13	Slovenia
14	Japan
15	Austria
16	Saudi Arabia
17	Portugal
18	Croatia
19	Faroe Islands
20	Tunisia
21	Brazil
22	Argentina
23	Bahrain
24	Kosovo
25	South Korea
26	Kuwait
27	Algeria
28	Uruguay
29	Guinea
30	Morocco
31	United States
32	Mexico

== Statistics and awards ==
=== Top goalscorers ===
Rank	Name	Goals	Shots	%
1	(Slovenia) Aljuš Anžič	67	86	78
2	(Slovenia) Mai Marguč	65	95	68
3	(Spain) Marcos Fis Ballester	61	84	73
4	(Saudi Arabia) Ahmed Al-Obaidi	60	82	73
4	(Portugal) João Lourenço	60	85	71
6	(Kosovo) Olsi Mulaj	53	87	61
6	(Switzerland) Niclas Mierzwa	53	63	84
8	(Norway) Vetle Mellemstrand Bore	52	78	65
9	(South Korea) Choi Yeon-gu	51	78	65
9	(Iceland) Ágúst Guðmundsson	51	72	71
9	(Sweden) Nikola Roganovic	51	94	54

Source: IHF

=== Top goalkeepers ===
Rank	Name	%	Saves	Shots
1	(Bahrain) Mohamed Abdulhusan	38	58	38
2	(Germany) Finn Knaack	35	75	213
2	(Guinea) Alpha	35	12	34
4	(France) Wilson Schultz	34	39	114
4	(Spain) David Failde	34	47	139
6	(Tunisia) Mohamed Chabchoub	33	44	132
7	(Austria) Sergej Novakovič	32	50	154
7	(Switzerland) Gwendal Dussey	32	32	99
7	(France) Timothé Riss	32	44	136
7	(Spain) Marcos García	32	21	65
7	(Brazil) Guilherme Ferreira	32	50	155
7	(Slovenia) Matevž Mlakar	32	81	252
7	(Tunisia) Ahmed Ben Nasr	32	24	75

Source: IHF

=== Awards ===
The All-star Team was announced on 17 August 2025.

Position	Player
Goalkeeper	(Germany) Finn Knaack
Right wing	(Egypt) Abdelrahman Aly
Right back	(Denmark) Emil Sørensen
Centre back	(Sweden) Nikola Roganovic
Left back	(Slovenia) Aljuš Anžič
Left wing	(Spain) Sergio Sánchez
Pivot	(Germany) Tim Schröder
MVP	(Spain) Marcos Fis Ballester
