= Egypt men's national under-19 handball team =

Egypt

Information
- Nickname: The Pharaohs
- Association: Egyptian Handball Federation

Colours
1st	2nd

Results

IHF U-19 World Championship
- Appearances: 11 (First in 2005)
- Best result: (gold) (2019)

African Youth Championship
- Appearances: 10 (First in 2004)
- Best result: (gold) (2004, 2008, 2010, 2012, 2014, 2018, 2022, 2024, 2026)
- Last updated on Unknown.

Egypt men's national under-19 handball team
Medal record

Youth Olympic Games
Gold medal – first place	2010 Singapore	
Silver medal – second place	2014 Nanjing	

World Youth Championship
Gold medal – first place	2019 North Macedonia	

African Youth Championship
Gold medal – first place	2004 Morocco	
Gold medal – first place	2008 Libya	
Gold medal – first place	2010 Gabon	
Gold medal – first place	2012 Ivory Coast	
Gold medal – first place	2014 Kenya	
Gold medal – first place	2018 Morocco	
Gold medal – first place	2022 Rwanda	
Gold medal – first place	2024 Tunisia	
Gold medal – first place	2026 Ivory Coast	
Silver medal – second place	2016 Mali	

The Egypt men's national under-19 handball team is the under-19s national team representing Egypt in the international handball competitions and is controlled by the Egyptian Handball Federation.

== Competitive record ==
Summer Youth Olympics
Games	Round	Position	Pld	W	D	L	GF	GA	GD
Singapore 2010	Final	Champions	4	3	1	0	138	84	+54
(China) Nanjing 2014	Final	Runners-Up	4	3	0	1	116	107	+9
(Argentina) Buenos Aires 2018	No Handball Event								
(Senegal) Dakar 2026	No Handball Event								
Total	Qualified:2/2		8	6	1	1	254	191	+63

IHF Men's U19 Handball World Championship
Games	Round	Position	Pld	W	D	L	GF	GA	GD
2005 Qatar	Preliminary Round	6th of 10	5	2	0	3	160	158	+2
2007 Bahrain	Main Round	5th of 16	7	4	0	3	235	200	+35
2009 Tunisia	Preliminary Round	12th of 20	6	2	0	4	188	172	+16
2011 Argentina	Quarter-Final	5th of 20	7	5	0	2	217	166	+51
2013 Hungary	Round of 16	14th of 24	9	4	0	5	305	278	+27
2015 Russia	Round of 16	15th of 24	7	3	0	4	205	194	+11
(Georgia (country)) 2017 Georgia	Round of 16	14th of 24	7	3	1	3	210	201	+9
2019 North Macedonia	Final	Champions	9	8	0	1	308	244	+64
2021 Greece	Cancelled								
2023 Croatia	Semi-Final	4th of 32	6	3	0	3	211	199	+12
2025 Egypt	Quarter-Final	5th of 32	8	5	2	1	291	235	+56
2027	Qualified								
Total	Qualified:12/12		71	39	3	29	2,330	2,047	+283

African Men's Youth Handball Championship
Games	Round	Position	Pld	W	D	L	GF	GA	GD
2000 Ivory Coast	Did not enter								
2004 Morocco	Final	Champions							
2008 Libya	Final	Champions							
2010 Gabon	Final	Champions							
2012 Ivory Coast	Final	Champions	5	5	0	0	172	99	+73
2014 Kenya	Final	Champions	4	4	0	0	123	78	+45
2016 Mali	Final	Runners-up	6	5	0	1	229	114	+115
2018 Morocco	Final	Champions	6	6	0	0	248	114	+134
2020 Morocco	Cancelled								
2022 Rwanda	Final	Champions	5	5	0	0	268	114	+154
2024 Tunisia	Final	Champions	6	6	0	0	283	117	+166
2026 Ivory Coast	Final	Champions	5	5	0	0	213	96	+117
Total	Qualified:11/12		37	36	0	1	1,536	732	+804

=== Mediterranean Handball Championship ===
- 2008 – (silver)
- 2014 – (gold)
- 2015 – (bronze)
- 2016 – (gold)
- 2019 – (bronze)
- 2020 – 6th
- 2022 – (silver)
- 2023 – 5th
- 2025 – (bronze)
- 2026 – (bronze)

== Team ==
=== Notable players ===
- Ahmed Hesham
- Hassan Walid
- Abdelrahman Mohamed

=== Notable coaches ===
- (Egypt) Magdy Abou El-Magd

== See also ==
- Egypt men's national handball team
- Egypt men's national under-21 handball team
- Egypt men's national under-17 handball team
- Egypt men's national beach handball team
- Egypt national wheelchair handball team
