= Tunisia men's national youth handball team =

Tunisia U-18

Information
- Nickname: نسور قرطاج (Eagles of Carthage)
- Association: Tunisian Handball Federation
- Coach: Helmi Abderazzak

Colours
1st	2nd

Results

Youth Olympic Games
- Appearances: 1 (First in 2014)
- Best result: 6th Place (2014)

IHF U-19 World Championship
- Appearances: 9 (First in 2005)
- Best result: 4th place (2009)

African Championship
- Appearances: 9 (First in 2004)
- Best result: Champions (gold) (2016)
- Last updated on Unknown.

Tunisia men's national youth handball team
Medal record

Representing Tunisia

Handball

African Youth Championship
Gold medal – first place	2016	
Silver medal – second place	2004	
Silver medal – second place	2008	
Silver medal – second place	2010	
Silver medal – second place	2012	
Silver medal – second place	2018	
Silver medal – second place	2024	
Silver medal – second place	2026	
Bronze medal – third place	2014	

Arab Youth Championship
Gold medal – first place	2012	
Gold medal – first place	2017	
Gold medal – first place	2019	
Silver medal – second place	2023	
Bronze medal – third place	1995	
Bronze medal – third place	2013	
Bronze medal – third place	2015	

Maghrebian Youth Championship
Gold medal – first place	2019	

The Tunisia national youth handball team is the Tunisia national under-18 handball team (Arabic: منتخب تونس تحت 18 سنة لكرة اليد), nicknamed Les Aigles de Carthage (The Eagles of Carthage or The Carthage Eagles), that represents Tunisia in the international handball competitions and it is Controlled by the Tunisian Handball Federation

== Competitive record ==
Champions Runners-up Third Place Fourth Place

- Red border color indicates tournament was held on home soil.

=== Youth Olympic Games ===
Tunisia in the Youth Olympic Games record
Year	Round	Position	GP	W	D	L	GS	GA	GD
Singapore 2010	Did not qualify								
China 2014	1st Round	6th	4	0	0	4	83	125	−42
Argentina 2018	No Handball Event								
Senegal 2022	No Handball Event								
Total	1/2	0 Title	4	0	0	4	83	125	−42

=== World Youth Championship ===
Tunisia in the Youth World Championship record
Year	Round	Position	GP	W	D	L	GS	GA	GD
Qatar 2005	First Round	9th Place	5	1	0	4	126	148	−22
Bahrain 2007	First Round	13th Place	6	2	0	4	188	170	+18
Tunisia 2009	Semi Finals	4th Place	7	5	0	2	205	179	+26
Argentina 2011	First Round	18th Place	6	1	1	4	165	161	+4
Hungary 2013	First Round	19th Place	7	2	0	5	195	215	−20
Russia 2015	Round of 16	14th Place	7	2	0	5	170	203	−33
(Georgia (country)) Georgia 2017	Eight Finals	11th Place	7	5	0	2	219	197	+22
North Macedonia 2019	Round of 16	16th Place	7	2	0	5	158	203	−45
Croatia 2023	Did not compete								
Egypt 2025	President's Cup	20th Place							
Total	9/10	0 Titles	52	20	1	31	1426	1476	−50

=== African Youth Championship ===
Tunisia in the African Youth Championship record
Year	Round	Position	GP	W	D	L	GS	GA	GD
Ivory Coast 2000	Did not compete								
Morocco 2004	Final Round	2nd							
(Lebanon) Libya 2008	Final Round	2nd							
Gabon 2010	Final Round	2nd							
Ivory Coast 2012	Final Round	2nd	5	4	0	1	155	110	+45
Kenya 2014	Semi Finals	3rd	4	3	0	1	109	81	+28
Mali 2016	Champions	1st	6	5	0	1	182	130	+52
Morocco 2018	Final Round	2nd	6	5	0	1	216	131	+85
Morocco 2020	Cancelled due to the COVID-19 pandemic								
Rwanda 2022	Did not compete								
Tunisia 2024	Final Round	2nd							
Ivory Coast 2026	Final Round	2nd							
Total	9/11	1 Titles							

=== Arab Youth Championship ===
Tunisia in the Arab Youth Championship record
Year	Round	Position	GP	W	D	L	GS	GA	GD
Saudi Arabia 1983	Did not compete								
Qatar 1985	Did not compete								
Iraq 1989	Did not compete								
Egypt 1993	Did not compete								
Qatar 1995	Third place	3rd							
Saudi Arabia 2012	Champions	1st							
Tunisia 2013	Third place	3rd							
Saudi Arabia 2015	Third place	3rd	6	6	1	3	150	158	−8
Saudi Arabia 2017	Champions	1st	6	6	0	0	183	107	+52
Tunisia 2019	Champions	1st	6	5	0	1	177	137	+40
Jordan 2023	Runners-up	2nd	6	4	1	1	172	135	+37
Total	7/11	3 Titles							

=== Maghrebian Youth Championship ===
Tunisia in the Maghrebian Youth Championship record
Year	Round	Position	GP	W	D	L	GS	GA	GD
Tunisia 2019	Champions	1st	3	3	0	0	80	47	+33
Total	1/1	1 Title	3	3	0	0	80	47	+33

== See also ==
- Tunisia men's national handball team
- Tunisia men's national junior handball team
- Tunisia women's national youth handball team

Other handball codes

- Tunisia national beach handball team
