= Qatar at the 2014 Summer Youth Olympics =

- IOC code: QAT
- NOC: Qatar Olympic Committee

in Nanjing
- Competitors: 21 in 7 sports
- Medals: Gold 0 Silver 0 Bronze 0 Total 0

Summer Youth Olympics appearances
- 2010; 2014; 2018

Qatar competed at the 2014 Summer Youth Olympics, in Nanjing, China from 16 August to 28 August 2014.

== Athletics ==
Qatar qualified one athlete.

Qualification Legend: Q=Final A (medal); qB=Final B (non-medal); qC=Final C (non-medal); qD=Final D (non-medal); qE=Final E (non-medal)

Boys
Track & road events

Athlete	Event	Heats		Final	
Athlete	Event	Result	Rank	Result	Rank
Idriss Moussa Yousef	800 m	1:50.77 PB	5 Q	DSQ	

== Equestrian ==
Qatar qualified a rider.

Athlete	Horse	Event	Round 1		Round 2			Total	
Athlete	Horse	Event	Penalties	Rank	Penalties	Total	Rank	Penalties	Rank
Hamad Al Qadi	Fernando	Equestrian at the 2014 Summer Youth Olympics – Individual jumping|Individual Jumping							
Asia; Li Yaofeng (CHN); Sayaka Fujiwara (JPN); Igor Kozubaev (KGZ); Hamad Al Qadi (QAT); Hisham Alsuwayni (KSA)	Uriah; Lasino; Fever; Fernando; Quick Sylver	Equestrian at the 2014 Summer Youth Olympics – Team jumping|Team Jumping	12; ~~13~~; ~~13~~; 0; 8	6	~~8~~; 0; ~~EL~~; 4; 4	28	6	28	6

== Gymnastics ==
=== Artistic Gymnastics ===
Qatar qualified one athlete based on its performance at the 2014 Asian Artistic Gymnastics Championships.

Girls

Athlete	Event	Apparatus				Total	Rank
Athlete	Event	F	V	UB	BB	Total	Rank
Rahma Al Dulaimi	Qualification	13.700 11	10.900 20	10.850 32	12.150 26	47.600	23

=== Trampoline ===
Qatar qualified one athlete based on its performance at the 2014 Asian Trampoline Championships.

Athlete	Event	Qualification				Final	
Athlete	Event	Routine 1	Routine 2	Total	Rank	Score	Rank
Nadeen Wehdan	Girls	39.180 9	47.790 9	86.970	9 R	did not advance	

Notes: Q=Qualified to Final; R=Reserve

== Handball ==
Qatar qualified a boys' team based on its performance at the 2013 Asian Youth Games

=== Boys' tournament ===
Roster

- Omar Abdelfattah
- Noomem Ahmadi
- Nour Ahmed]]
- Irhad Alihodzic
- Adson Bajric
- Salem Braham
- Faruk Colo
- Amor Dhiab
- Ebrahim Ebaid
- Amine Guehis
- Moustafa Heiba
- Abdulaziz Helali
- Bilal Lepenica
- Bozo Subotic

Group stage

Team	Pld	W	D	L	GF	GA	GD	Pts	Qualification
Slovenia	2	2	0	0	71	35	+36	4	Semifinals
Qatar	2	1	0	1	49	61	−12	2	Semifinals
Tunisia	2	0	0	2	35	59	−24	0	5th place game

20 August; 20:00	Tunisia	23 - 26	Qatar	Jiangning Sports Centre Gymnasium, Nanjing
20 August; 20:00	Oussama Ghachem	(13 - 11)	Amine Guehis	Jiangning Sports Centre Gymnasium, Nanjing
20 August; 20:00	4× (yellow card) 3× (suspension)		3× (yellow card) 3× (suspension) 1× (red card)	Jiangning Sports Centre Gymnasium, Nanjing

22 August; 20:00	Qatar	23 - 38	Slovenia	Jiangning Sports Centre Gymnasium, Nanjing

Semifinals

24 August; 18:00	Egypt	34 - 26	Qatar	Jiangning Sports Center Gymnasium
24 August; 18:00		(30 - 25)		Jiangning Sports Center Gymnasium

Bronze Medal Match

25 August; 15:30	Qatar 4th	25 - 33	Norway	Jiangning Sports Center Gymnasium
25 August; 15:30		(13 - 19)		Jiangning Sports Center Gymnasium

== Shooting ==
Qatar was given a wild card to compete.

Individual

Athlete	Event	Qualification		Final	
Athlete	Event	Points	Rank	Points	Rank
Abdullah Alsunaidi	Shooting at the 2014 Summer Youth Olympics – Boys' 10 metre air rifle|Boys' 10m Air Rifle	609.6	12	did not advance	

Team

Athletes	Event	Qualification		Round of 16	Quarterfinals	Semifinals	Final / BM	Rank
Athletes	Event	Points	Rank	Opposition Result	Opposition Result	Opposition Result	Opposition Result	Rank
Abdullah Alsunaidi (QAT); Rebecca Köck (AUT)	Shooting at the 2014 Summer Youth Olympics – Mixed teams' 10 metre air rifle|Mixed Team 10m Air Rifle							

== Swimming ==
Qatar qualified one swimmer.

Boys

Athlete	Event	Heat		Semifinal		Final	
Athlete	Event	Time	Rank	Time	Rank	Time	Rank
Walid Daloul	50 m breaststroke	30.83	35	did not advance			
Walid Daloul	100 m breaststroke	1:07.42	34	did not advance			

== Table Tennis ==
Qatar qualified one athlete based on its performance at the Asian Qualification Event.

Singles

Athlete	Event	Group Stage	Rank	Round of 16	Quarterfinals	Semifinals	Final / BM	Rank
Athlete	Event	Opposition Score	Rank	Opposition Score	Opposition Score	Opposition Score	Opposition Score	Rank
Abdulrahman Al-Naggar	Table tennis at the 2014 Summer Youth Olympics – Boys' singles|Boys							

Team

Athletes	Event	Group Stage	Rank	Round of 16	Quarterfinals	Semifinals	Final / BM	Rank
Athletes	Event	Opposition Score	Rank	Opposition Score	Opposition Score	Opposition Score	Opposition Score	Rank
Asia 1 Regina Kim (UZB); Abdulrahman Al-Naggar (QAT)	Mixed	Group A China; Liu (CHN); Fan (CHN); L 0-3	qB			United States; Zhang (USA); Avvari (USA); L 0 - 2	did not advance	19
Asia 1 Regina Kim (UZB); Abdulrahman Al-Naggar (QAT)	Mixed	Poland; Bajor (POL); Zatowka (POL)	qB			United States; Zhang (USA); Avvari (USA); L 0 - 2	did not advance	19

Qualification Legend: Q=Main Bracket (medal); qB=Consolation Bracket (non-medal)
