= 2014 African Men's Youth Handball Championship =

Tournament details
- Host country: Kenya
- Venue(s): 1 (in 1 host city)
- Dates: March 15–21, 2014
- Teams: 11 (from 1 confederation)

Final positions
- Champions: Egypt (5th title)
- Runner-up: Algeria
- Third place: Tunisia
- Fourth place: Angola

Tournament statistics
- Matches played: 25
- Goals scored: 1,306 (52.24 per match)

The 2014 African Men's Youth Handball Championship was the 6th edition of the tournament, organized by the African Handball Confederation, under the auspices of the International Handball Federation and held in Nairobi, Kenya from 15 to 21 March 2014.

Egypt was the champion and qualified to both the 2015 world championship and the 2014 Youth Olympics whereas the three remaining top teams qualified for the 2015 world championship.

== Draw ==
Group A	Group B	Group C
Egypt; Guinea; Libya	Algeria; Niger; Tunisia	Angola; Kenya; Zambia

== Preliminary round ==
Nine teams were drawn into three groups of three, with the top team of each group plus the second best of all the groups qualifying for the semifinal, the remaining two second-placed teams playing for the 5-6 classification whereas the third-placed teams of each group played for the 7-9 classification matches.

All times are local (UTC+3).

=== Group A ===
Qualified to the Semi-finals
Relegated to the 5-6 classification
Relegated to the 7-9 classification

Team	Pld	W	D	L	GF	GA	GD	Pts
Egypt	2	2	0	0	71	37	+34	4
Libya	2	1	0	1	45	58	−13	2
Guinea	2	0	0	2	46	67	−21	0

15 March 2014; 10:00	Egypt	38 – 21	Guinea	Nairobi
15 March 2014; 10:00		(15–12)		Nairobi

16 March 2014; 14:00	Libya	29 – 25	Guinea	Nairobi
16 March 2014; 14:00		(17–13)		Nairobi

17 March 2014; 14:00	Egypt	33 – 16	Libya	Nairobi
17 March 2014; 14:00		(17–06)		Nairobi

=== Group B ===
Qualified to the Semi-finals
Relegated to the 7-9 classification

Team	Pld	W	D	L	GF	GA	GD	Pts
Tunisia	2	2	0	0	66	39	+27	4
Algeria	2	1	0	1	54	47	+7	2
Niger	2	0	0	2	39	73	−34	0

15 March 2014; 14:00	Tunisia	40 – 18	Niger	Nairobi
15 March 2014; 14:00		(19–07)		Nairobi

16 March 2014; 14:00	Algeria	33 – 21	Niger	Nairobi
16 March 2014; 14:00		(17–12)		Nairobi

17 March 2014; 16:00	Tunisia	26 – 21	Algeria	Nairobi
17 March 2014; 16:00		(11–14)		Nairobi

=== Group C ===
Qualified to the Semi-finals
Relegated to the 5-6 classification
Relegated to the 7-9 classification

Team	Pld	W	D	L	GF	GA	GD	Pts
Angola	2	2	0	0	68	33	+35	4
Kenya	2	1	0	1	49	50	−1	2
Zambia	2	0	0	2	37	71	−34	0

15 March 2014; 17:00	Angola	28 – 18	Kenya	Nairobi
15 March 2014; 17:00		(10–06)		Nairobi

16 March 2014; 18:00	Angola	40 – 15	Zambia	Nairobi
16 March 2014; 18:00		(17–10)		Nairobi

17 March 2014; 18:00	Kenya	31 – 22	Zambia	Nairobi
17 March 2014; 18:00		(11–10)		Nairobi

== Placement round 7–9 ==
=== Bracket ===
Cross matches
18 March 2014 - 14:00
Guinea	40
Zambia	29

9th place final
19 March 2014 - 10:00
Niger	41
Zambia	12

7th place final
20 March 2014 - 14:00
Guinea	35
Niger	22

=== 7th–9th place ===
18 March 2014; 14:00	Guinea	40 – 29	Zambia	Nairobi
18 March 2014; 14:00		(22–15)		Nairobi

19 March 2014; 10:00	Niger	41 – 12	Zambia	Nairobi
19 March 2014; 10:00		(21–03)		Nairobi

=== 7th place game ===
20 March 2014; 14:00	Guinea	35 – 22	Niger	Nairobi
20 March 2014; 14:00		(16–12)		Nairobi

== Placement round 5–6 ==
19 March 2014; 14:00	Libya	23 – 16	Kenya	Nairobi
19 March 2014; 14:00		(12–10)		Nairobi

== Final round ==
=== Bracket ===
Semifinals
19 March 2014 – 16:00
Egypt	26
Tunisia	19
19 March 2014 – 18:00
Algeria	24
Angola	22

Final
21 March 2014 – 18:00
Egypt	26
Algeria	22
Bronze medal match
21 March 2014 – 16:00
Tunisia	24
Angola	16

=== Semi finals ===
19 March 2014; 16:00	Egypt	26 – 19	Tunisia	Nairobi
19 March 2014; 16:00		(12–08)		Nairobi

19 March 2014; 18:00	Algeria	24 – 22	Angola	Nairobi
19 March 2014; 18:00		(10–10)		Nairobi

=== Bronze medal game ===
21 March 2014; 16:00	Tunisia	24 – 16	Angola	Nairobi
21 March 2014; 16:00		(11–07)		Nairobi

=== Final ===
21 March 2014; 18:00	Egypt	26 – 22	Algeria	Nairobi
21 March 2014; 18:00		(12–12)		Nairobi

== Final standings ==
Qualified for the 2015 World Championship and 2014 Youth Olympics
Qualified for the 2015 World Championship

Rank	Team	Record
Gold medal	Egypt	4–0
Silver medal	Algeria	2–2
Bronze medal	Tunisia	2–2
4	Angola	2–2
5	Libya	2–1
6	Kenya	1–2
7	Guinea	2–2
8	Niger	1–3
9	Zambia	0–4

== Awards ==
2014 African Men's Youth Handball Championship

Egypt
5th title

== See also ==
- 2014 African Men's Handball Championship
- 2014 African Men's Junior Handball Championship
