= African Men's Youth Handball Championship =

International handball competition

- Current season, competition or edition: 2026 African Men's Youth Handball Championship
- Sport: Handball
- Founded: 2000
- First season: 2000 African Men's Youth Handball Championship
- Continent: Africa (CAHB)
- Most recent champion: Egypt (9th title)
- Most titles: Egypt (9 titles)

The African Men's Youth Handball Championship is the official competition for youth men's national handball teams of Africa and takes place every two years. In addition to crowning the African champions, the tournament also serves as a qualifying tournament for the Youth World Championship. Egypt is the most successful national team with a record number of eight (8) titles out of nine (9) participants.

== Summary ==
#	Year	Host	Final			Third place match		
#	Year	Host	Champion	Score	Runner-up	Third place	Score	Fourth place
I	2000; Details	(Ivory Coast); Abidjan	Benin	–	Nigeria	Ivory Coast	–	Burkina Faso
II	2004; Details	(Morocco); Casablanca	Egypt	–	Tunisia	Morocco	–	
III	2008; Details	(Libya); Tripoli	Egypt	31–24	Tunisia	Libya	24–17	Benin
V	2010; Details	(Gabon); Libreville	Egypt	25–24	Tunisia	Gabon	22–20	Algeria
VII	2012; Details	(Ivory Coast); Abidjan	Egypt	27–22	Tunisia	Angola	30–23	Gabon
IX	2014; Details	(Kenya); Nairobi	Egypt	26–22	Algeria	Tunisia	24–16	Angola
	2016; Details	(Mali); Bamako	Tunisia	26–25	Egypt	Algeria	22–15	DR Congo
	2018; Details	(Morocco); Marrakesh	Egypt	No playoffs	Tunisia	Nigeria	No playoffs	Algeria
	2020	(Morocco); Casablanca	Cancelled due to the COVID-19 pandemic					
XVIII	2022; Details	(Rwanda); Kigali	Egypt	51–29	Rwanda	Morocco	41–34	Burundi
XX	2024; Details	(Tunisia); Mahdia	Egypt	34–29	Tunisia	Guinea	20–11	Morocco
XXII	2026; Details	(Ivory Coast); Abidjan	Egypt	28–25	Tunisia	Morocco	18–17	Guinea

== Medal count ==
Rank	Nation	Gold	Silver	Bronze	Total
1	Egypt	9	1	0	10
2	Tunisia	1	7	1	9
3	Benin	1	0	0	1
4	Algeria	0	1	1	2
4	Nigeria	0	1	1	2
6	Rwanda	0	1	0	1
7	Morocco	0	0	3	3
8	Angola	0	0	1	1
8	Gabon	0	0	1	1
8	Guinea	0	0	1	1
8	Ivory Coast	0	0	1	1
8	Libya	0	0	1	1
Totals (12 entries)		11	11	11	33

== Participating nations ==
Nation	(Ivory Coast) 2000	(Morocco) 2004	(Libya) 2008	(Gabon) 2010	(Ivory Coast) 2012	(Kenya) 2014	(Mali) 2016	(Morocco) 2018	(Rwanda) 2022	(Tunisia) 2024	(Ivory Coast) 2026	Years
Algeria				4th	7th	2nd	3rd	4th	5th	5th	9th	8
Angola				5th	3rd	4th						3
Benin	1st		4th									2
Burkina Faso	4th											2
Burundi									4th	8th	11th	3
Cameroon				7th							5th	2
Congo					9th						10th	2
DR Congo					6th		4th					2
Egypt		1st	1st	1st	1st	1st	2nd	1st	1st	1st	1st	10
Gabon				3rd	4th							2
Guinea					10th	7th	6th	5th		3rd	4th	6
Ivory Coast	3rd			8th	8th						7th	4
Kenya						6th				7th		2
Libya			3rd		5th	5th			7th	6th	12th	6
Madagascar									8th		13th	2
Mali	6th						8th					2
Mauritania								7th				1
Morocco		3rd	5th	6th			5th	6th	3rd	4th	3rd	8
Niger	5th					8th						2
Nigeria	2nd							3rd			6th	3
Rwanda							7th		2nd		8th	3
Tunisia		2nd	2nd	2nd	2nd	3rd	1st	2nd		2nd	2nd	9
Uganda									6th			1
Zambia						9th					14th	2
# Teams	6	3	5	8	10	9	8	7	8	8	14	

== See also ==
- African Men's Junior Handball Championship
- African Women's Junior Handball Championship
