= Handball at the 2014 Summer Youth Olympics – Boys' tournament =

Boys' handball at the II Summer Youth Games
Tournament details
- Host country: China
- Venue: 1 (in 1 host city)
- Dates: 20–25 August
- Teams: 6 (from 4 confederations)

Final positions
- Champions: Slovenia (1st title)
- Runners-up: Egypt
- Third place: Norway
- Fourth place: Qatar

Tournament statistics
- Matches played: 12
- Goals scored: 687 (57.25 per match)

The Boys' handball tournament at the 2014 Summer Youth Olympics in Nanjing was held from 20 to 25 August at the Jiangning Sports Center Gymnasium.

== Participating teams ==
Group A

- Brazil
- Egypt
- Norway

Group B

- Slovenia
- Qatar
- Tunisia

== Preliminary round ==
All times are local (UTC+8).

=== Group A ===
Team	Pld	W	D	L	GF	GA	GD	Pts	Qualification
Egypt	2	2	0	0	57	50	+7	4	Semifinals
Norway	2	1	0	1	60	59	+1	2	Semifinals
Brazil	2	0	0	2	54	62	−8	0	5th place game

20 August; 18:00	Norway	27–28	Egypt	Jiangning Sports Centre Gymnasium, Nanjing; Referees: Brunner, Salah (SUI)
20 August; 18:00	Horgen 10	(11–14)	Refaat 8	Jiangning Sports Centre Gymnasium, Nanjing; Referees: Brunner, Salah (SUI)
20 August; 18:00	3× (yellow card) 4× (suspension)	Report	3× (yellow card) 5× (suspension)	Jiangning Sports Centre Gymnasium, Nanjing; Referees: Brunner, Salah (SUI)

21 August; 18:00	Brazil	31–33	Norway	Jiangning Sports Centre Gymnasium, Nanjing; Referees: Li, Liu (CHN)
21 August; 18:00	Lemos 10	(15–19)	Hauane 7	Jiangning Sports Centre Gymnasium, Nanjing; Referees: Li, Liu (CHN)
21 August; 18:00	2× (yellow card) 1× (suspension)	Report	4× (yellow card) 6× (suspension)	Jiangning Sports Centre Gymnasium, Nanjing; Referees: Li, Liu (CHN)

22 August; 18:00	Egypt	29–23	Brazil	Jiangning Sports Centre Gymnasium, Nanjing; Referees: Salah, Brunner (SUI)
22 August; 18:00	Refaat 7	(16–10)	Lemos 11	Jiangning Sports Centre Gymnasium, Nanjing; Referees: Salah, Brunner (SUI)
22 August; 18:00	3× (yellow card) 5× (suspension)	Report	3× (yellow card) 7× (suspension)	Jiangning Sports Centre Gymnasium, Nanjing; Referees: Salah, Brunner (SUI)

=== Group B ===
Team	Pld	W	D	L	GF	GA	GD	Pts	Qualification
Slovenia	2	2	0	0	71	35	+36	4	Semifinals
Qatar	2	1	0	1	49	61	−12	2	Semifinals
Tunisia	2	0	0	2	35	59	−24	0	5th place game

20 August; 20:00	Tunisia	23–26	Qatar	Jiangning Sports Centre Gymnasium, Nanjing; Referees: Li, Liu (CHN)
20 August; 20:00	Ghachem 7 Haj Romdhane 4 Mzoughi 3 Ayari, Memmich, Bouteffaha, Ben Araar 2 Ben Abdallah 1	(13–11)	Guehis 6 Ahmadi 5 Dhiab 4 Abdelfattah, Helali 3 Braham, Damjanovic 2 Colo 1	Jiangning Sports Centre Gymnasium, Nanjing; Referees: Li, Liu (CHN)
20 August; 20:00	4× (yellow card) 3× (suspension)	Report	3× (yellow card) 3× (suspension) 1× (red card)	Jiangning Sports Centre Gymnasium, Nanjing; Referees: Li, Liu (CHN)

21 August; 20:00	Slovenia	33–12	Tunisia	Jiangning Sports Centre Gymnasium, Nanjing; Referees: Laurell, Engberg (SWE)
21 August; 20:00	Marguč 10; Kavčič 5 Malus, Janc 4 Prevolnik, Sokolič 3 Beđeti 2 Kikanović, Rašo 1	(18–4)	Ben Dhia 4 Ghachem 3 Ben Araar 2 Ayari, Haj Romdhane, Zouaoui 1	Jiangning Sports Centre Gymnasium, Nanjing; Referees: Laurell, Engberg (SWE)
21 August; 20:00	2× (yellow card) 5× (suspension)	Report	4× (yellow card) 10× (suspension)	Jiangning Sports Centre Gymnasium, Nanjing; Referees: Laurell, Engberg (SWE)

22 August; 20:00	Qatar	23–38	Slovenia	Jiangning Sports Centre Gymnasium, Nanjing; Referees: Gasmi, Gasmi (FRA)
22 August; 20:00	three players 4	(10–17)	Marguč 9	Jiangning Sports Centre Gymnasium, Nanjing; Referees: Gasmi, Gasmi (FRA)
22 August; 20:00	3× (yellow card) 3× (suspension)	Report	3× (yellow card) 5× (suspension)	Jiangning Sports Centre Gymnasium, Nanjing; Referees: Gasmi, Gasmi (FRA)

== Knockout stage ==
=== Fifth place game ===
24 August; 11:00	Brazil	38–31	Tunisia	Jiangning Sports Centre Gymnasium, Nanjing; Referees: Li, Wang (CHN)
24 August; 11:00	Lemos 10	(23–15)	Memmich 8	Jiangning Sports Centre Gymnasium, Nanjing; Referees: Li, Wang (CHN)
24 August; 11:00	4× (yellow card) 5× (suspension) 1× (red card)	Report	3× (yellow card) 5× (suspension)	Jiangning Sports Centre Gymnasium, Nanjing; Referees: Li, Wang (CHN)

25 August; 11:00	Tunisia	27–28	Brazil	Jiangning Sports Centre Gymnasium, Nanjing; Referees: Li, Liu (CHN)
25 August; 11:00	Ben Abdallah, Ghachem 5	(12–13)	Petter 6	Jiangning Sports Centre Gymnasium, Nanjing; Referees: Li, Liu (CHN)
25 August; 11:00	4× (yellow card) 6× (suspension) 1× (red card)	Report	3× (yellow card) 7× (suspension) 3× (red card)	Jiangning Sports Centre Gymnasium, Nanjing; Referees: Li, Liu (CHN)

Brazil wins 66–58 on aggregate

=== Semifinals ===
24 August; 18:00	Egypt	34–26	Qatar	Jiangning Sports Center Gymnasium; Referees: Gasmi, Gasmi (FRA)
24 August; 18:00	Refaat 9	(15–14)	Guehis 7	Jiangning Sports Center Gymnasium; Referees: Gasmi, Gasmi (FRA)
24 August; 18:00	3× (yellow card) 6× (suspension)	Report	4× (yellow card) 4× (suspension)	Jiangning Sports Center Gymnasium; Referees: Gasmi, Gasmi (FRA)

24 August; 20:00	Norway	30–33	Slovenia	Jiangning Sports Center Gymnasium; Referees: Laurell, Engberg (SWE)
24 August; 20:00	Horgen 8	(14–13)	Cvetko 10	Jiangning Sports Center Gymnasium; Referees: Laurell, Engberg (SWE)
24 August; 20:00	2× (yellow card) 3× (suspension)	Report	3× (yellow card) 3× (suspension)	Jiangning Sports Center Gymnasium; Referees: Laurell, Engberg (SWE)

=== Bronze medal game ===
25 August; 15:30	Qatar	25–33	Norway (bronze)	Jiangning Sports Center Gymnasium; Referees: Brunner, Salah (SUI)
25 August; 15:30	Colo 6	(13–19)	Rød 11	Jiangning Sports Center Gymnasium; Referees: Brunner, Salah (SUI)
25 August; 15:30	3× (yellow card) 6× (suspension)	Report	3× (yellow card) 6× (suspension)	Jiangning Sports Center Gymnasium; Referees: Brunner, Salah (SUI)

=== Gold medal game ===
25 August; 20:30	(silver) Egypt	25–31	Slovenia (gold)	Jiangning Sports Center Gymnasium; Referees: Gasmi, Gasmi (FRA)
25 August; 20:30	Refaat 5	(11–13)	Janc, Marguč 8	Jiangning Sports Center Gymnasium; Referees: Gasmi, Gasmi (FRA)
25 August; 20:30	2× (yellow card) 8× (suspension) 1× (red card)		3× (yellow card) 7× (suspension)	Jiangning Sports Center Gymnasium; Referees: Gasmi, Gasmi (FRA)

== Final ranking ==
Rank	Team
1st place, gold medalist(s)	Slovenia
2nd place, silver medalist(s)	Egypt
3rd place, bronze medalist(s)	Norway
4	Qatar
5	Brazil
6	Tunisia
