= 2024 African Men's Youth Handball Championship =

Tournament details
- Host country: Tunisia
- Dates: 19–26 September
- Teams: 8 (from 1 confederation)

Final positions
- Champions: Egypt (8th title)
- Runners-up: Tunisia
- Third place: Guinea
- Fourth place: Morocco

The 2024 African Men's Youth Handball Championship was held in Tunisia from 19 to 16 September 2024. It also acted as a qualification tournament for the 2025 IHF Men's U19 Handball World Championship.

== Draw ==
The draw was held on 19 August 2024 at the head office of the African Handball Confederation in Abidjan, Ivory Coast.

== Preliminary round ==
All times are local (UTC+1).

=== Group A ===
Pos	Team	Pld	W	D	L	GF	GA	GD	Pts	Qualification
1	Egypt	3	3	0	0	154	59	+95	6	Quarterfinals
2	Guinea	3	2	0	1	96	97	−1	4	Quarterfinals
3	Algeria	3	1	0	2	92	107	−15	2	Quarterfinals
4	Burundi	3	0	0	3	71	150	−79	0	Quarterfinals

Rules for classification: 1) Points; 2) Head-to-head points; 3) Head-to-head goal difference; 4) Head-to-head goals scored; 5) Goal difference; 6) Goals scored; 7) Draw.

19 September 2024; 15:00	Egypt	46–22	Guinea	Mahdia
19 September 2024; 15:00		(24–7)		Mahdia

19 September 2024; 16:00	Algeria	45–30	Burundi	Ksour Essef
19 September 2024; 16:00		(17–14)		Ksour Essef

20 September 2024; 15:00	Burundi	15–66	Egypt	Mahdia
20 September 2024; 15:00		(11–29)		Mahdia

20 September 2024; 18:00	Guinea	35–25	Algeria	Ksour Essef
20 September 2024; 18:00		(14–9)		Ksour Essef

21 September 2024; 15:00	Burundi	26–39	Guinea	Mahdia
21 September 2024; 15:00		(11–21)		Mahdia

21 September 2024; 18:00	Egypt	42–22	Algeria	Ksour Essef
21 September 2024; 18:00		(22–11)		Ksour Essef

=== Group B ===
Pos	Team	Pld	W	D	L	GF	GA	GD	Pts	Qualification
1	Tunisia (H)	3	3	0	0	100	50	+50	6	Quarterfinals
2	Morocco	3	2	0	1	64	69	−5	4	Quarterfinals
3	Libya	3	1	0	2	70	72	−2	2	Quarterfinals
4	Kenya	3	0	0	3	63	106	−43	0	Quarterfinals

Rules for classification: 1) Points; 2) Head-to-head points; 3) Head-to-head goal difference; 4) Head-to-head goals scored; 5) Goal difference; 6) Goals scored; 7) Draw.
(H) Hosts

19 September 2024; 18:00	Tunisia	30–17	Libya	Mahdia
19 September 2024; 18:00		(15–12)		Mahdia

19 September 2024; 18:00	Morocco	27–25	Kenya	Ksour Essef
19 September 2024; 18:00		(12–9)		Ksour Essef

20 September 2024; 16:00	Libya	18–20	Morocco	Ksour Essef
20 September 2024; 16:00		(8–10)		Ksour Essef

20 September 2024; 18:00	Kenya	16–44	Tunisia	Mahdia
20 September 2024; 18:00		(8–24)		Mahdia

21 September 2024; 16:00	Libya	35–22	Kenya	Ksour Essef
21 September 2024; 16:00		(20–15)		Ksour Essef

21 September 2024; 18:00	Morocco	17–26	Tunisia	Mahdia
21 September 2024; 18:00		(9–15)		Mahdia

== Knockout stage ==
=== Bracket ===
Quarter-finals
23 September
Egypt	55
Kenya	14
23 September
Morocco	25
Algeria	20
23 September
Libya	22
Guinea	34
23 September
Tunisia	48
Burundi	27

Semifinals
24 September
Egypt	40
Morocco	15
24 September
Guinea	22
Tunisia	31

Final
26 September
Egypt	34
Tunisia	29
Third place
26 September
Morocco	11
Guinea	20

5–8th place semifinals
24 September
Kenya	28
Algeria	35
24 September
Libya	29
Burundi	25

Fifth place
25 September
Algeria	26
Libya	25
Seventh place
25 September
Kenya	32
Burundi	29

=== Quarterfinals ===
23 September 2024; 15:00	Morocco	25–20	Algeria	Mahdia
23 September 2024; 15:00		(12–10)		Mahdia

23 September 2024; 15:00	Libya	22–34	Guinea	Ksour Essef
23 September 2024; 15:00		(9–11)		Ksour Essef

23 September 2024; 18:00	Tunisia	48–27	Burundi	Mahdia
23 September 2024; 18:00		(24–11)		Mahdia

23 September 2024; 18:00	Egypt	55–14	Kenya	Ksour Essef
23 September 2024; 18:00		(28–7)		Ksour Essef

=== 5–8th place semifinals ===
24 September 2024; 16:00	Kenya	28–35	Algeria	Ksour Essef
24 September 2024; 16:00		(14–18)		Ksour Essef

24 September 2024; 18:00	Libya	29–25	Burundi	Ksour Essef
24 September 2024; 18:00		(12–9)		Ksour Essef

=== Semifinals ===
24 September 2024; 15:00	Egypt	40–15	Morocco	Mahdia
24 September 2024; 15:00		(23–8)		Mahdia

24 September 2024; 18:00	Guinea	22–31	Tunisia	Mahdia
24 September 2024; 18:00		(9–13)		Mahdia

=== Seventh place game ===
25 September 2024; 16:00	Kenya	32–29	Burundi
25 September 2024; 16:00		(17–12)

=== Fifth place game ===
25 September 2024; 18:00	Algeria	26–25	Libya
25 September 2024; 18:00		(15–13)

=== Third place game ===
26 September 2024; 15:00	Morocco	11–20	Guinea
26 September 2024; 15:00		(7–6)

=== Final ===
26 September 2024; 18:00	Egypt	34–29	Tunisia
26 September 2024; 18:00		(15–16)

== Final standings ==
Rank	Team
1st place, gold medalist(s)	Egypt
2nd place, silver medalist(s)	Tunisia
3rd place, bronze medalist(s)	Guinea
4	Morocco
5	Algeria
6	Libya
7	Kenya
8	Burundi

Team qualified for the 2025 U19 World Championship
Team qualified for the 2025 U19 World Championship as a host nation
