= 2018 African Men's Youth Handball Championship =

Sports competition

Tournament details
- Host country: Morocco
- Venue(s): 1 (in 1 host city)
- Dates: 15–22 September
- Teams: 7 (from 1 confederation)

Final positions
- Champions: Egypt (6th title)
- Runner-up: Tunisia
- Third place: Nigeria
- Fourth place: Algeria

Tournament statistics
- Matches played: 20
- Goals scored: 1,253 (62.65 per match)

The 2018 African Men's Youth Handball Championship was held in Marrakesh, Morocco from 15 to 22 September 2018 at the Prince Moulay Rachid Hall. The top three teams qualified for the 2019 Men's Youth World Handball Championship.

== Results ==
All times are local (UTC+1).

Pos	Team	Pld	W	D	L	GF	GA	GD	Pts	Qualification
1st place, gold medalist(s)	Egypt	6	6	0	0	248	114	+134	12	2019 Youth World Championship
2nd place, silver medalist(s)	Tunisia	6	5	0	1	216	125	+91	10	2019 Youth World Championship
3rd place, bronze medalist(s)	Nigeria	6	3	1	2	183	155	+28	7	2019 Youth World Championship
4	Algeria	6	3	0	3	237	150	+87	6	
5	Guinea	6	2	1	3	197	164	+33	5	
6	Morocco (H)	6	1	0	5	108	152	−44	2	
7	Mauritania	6	0	0	6	64	393	−329	0	

Rules for classification: 1) Points; 2) Head-to-head points; 3) Head-to-head goal difference; 4) Head-to-head goals scored; 5) Goal difference; 6) Goals scored; 7) Draw.
(H) Hosts

15 September 2018; 15:00	Egypt	30–17	Nigeria	Prince Moulay Rachid Hall, Marrakesh
15 September 2018; 15:00		(7–9)		Prince Moulay Rachid Hall, Marrakesh

15 September 2018; 17:00	Tunisia	31–26	Algeria	Prince Moulay Rachid Hall, Marrakesh
15 September 2018; 17:00		(14–13)		Prince Moulay Rachid Hall, Marrakesh

15 September 2018; 19:00	Morocco	10–0; Forfeit	Mauritania	Prince Moulay Rachid Hall, Marrakesh

16 September 2018; 15:00	Guinea	22–34	Tunisia	Prince Moulay Rachid Hall, Marrakesh
16 September 2018; 15:00		(14–13)		Prince Moulay Rachid Hall, Marrakesh

16 September 2018; 17:00	Algeria	82–7	Mauritania	Prince Moulay Rachid Hall, Marrakesh
16 September 2018; 17:00		(42–2)		Prince Moulay Rachid Hall, Marrakesh

16 September 2018; 19:00	Egypt	32–17	Morocco	Prince Moulay Rachid Hall, Marrakesh
16 September 2018; 19:00		(13–9)		Prince Moulay Rachid Hall, Marrakesh

17 September 2018; 15:00	Nigeria	32–31	Algeria	Prince Moulay Rachid Hall, Marrakesh
17 September 2018; 15:00		(14–16)		Prince Moulay Rachid Hall, Marrakesh

17 September 2018; 17:00	Mauritania	15–78	Guinea	Prince Moulay Rachid Hall, Marrakesh
17 September 2018; 17:00		(6–36)		Prince Moulay Rachid Hall, Marrakesh

17 September 2018; 19:00	Morocco	17–25	Tunisia	Prince Moulay Rachid Hall, Marrakesh
17 September 2018; 19:00		(9–12)		Prince Moulay Rachid Hall, Marrakesh

18 September 2018; 15:00	Algeria	24–35	Egypt	Prince Moulay Rachid Hall, Marrakesh
18 September 2018; 15:00		(11–19)		Prince Moulay Rachid Hall, Marrakesh

18 September 2018; 17:00	Nigeria	49–16	Mauritania	Prince Moulay Rachid Hall, Marrakesh
18 September 2018; 17:00		(23–6)		Prince Moulay Rachid Hall, Marrakesh

18 September 2018; 19:00	Morocco	19–24	Guinea	Prince Moulay Rachid Hall, Marrakesh
18 September 2018; 19:00		(7–15)		Prince Moulay Rachid Hall, Marrakesh

20 September 2018; 15:00	Egypt	93–16	Mauritania	Prince Moulay Rachid Hall, Marrakesh
20 September 2018; 15:00		(38–7)		Prince Moulay Rachid Hall, Marrakesh

20 September 2018; 17:00	Algeria	36–25	Guinea	Prince Moulay Rachid Hall, Marrakesh
20 September 2018; 17:00		(15–11)		Prince Moulay Rachid Hall, Marrakesh

20 September 2018; 19:00	Tunisia	29–28	Nigeria	Prince Moulay Rachid Hall, Marrakesh
20 September 2018; 19:00		(12–12)		Prince Moulay Rachid Hall, Marrakesh

21 September 2018; 15:00	Egypt	36–24	Guinea	Prince Moulay Rachid Hall, Marrakesh
21 September 2018; 15:00		(16–9)		Prince Moulay Rachid Hall, Marrakesh

21 September 2018; 17:00	Tunisia	81–10	Mauritania	Prince Moulay Rachid Hall, Marrakesh
21 September 2018; 17:00		(40–8)		Prince Moulay Rachid Hall, Marrakesh

21 September 2018; 19:00	Morocco	25–33	Nigeria	Prince Moulay Rachid Hall, Marrakesh
21 September 2018; 19:00		(10–15)		Prince Moulay Rachid Hall, Marrakesh

22 September 2018; 15:00	Guinea	24–24	Nigeria	Prince Moulay Rachid Hall, Marrakesh
22 September 2018; 15:00		(11–9)		Prince Moulay Rachid Hall, Marrakesh

22 September 2018; 17:00	Algeria	38–20	Morocco	Prince Moulay Rachid Hall, Marrakesh
22 September 2018; 17:00		(21–7)		Prince Moulay Rachid Hall, Marrakesh

22 September 2018; 19:00	Tunisia	16–22	Egypt	Prince Moulay Rachid Hall, Marrakesh
22 September 2018; 19:00		(6–10)		Prince Moulay Rachid Hall, Marrakesh
