= 2012 African Men's Youth Handball Championship =

Tournament details
- Host country: Ivory Coast
- Venue(s): 1 (in 1 host city)
- Dates: August 21–26
- Teams: 11 (from 1 confederation)

Final positions
- Champions: Egypt (4th title)
- Runner-up: Tunisia
- Third place: Angola
- Fourth place: Gabon

Tournament statistics
- Matches played: 25
- Goals scored: 1,306 (52.24 per match)

The 2012 African Men's Youth Handball Championship was the 5th edition of the tournament, organized by the African Handball Confederation, under the auspices of the International Handball Federation and held in Abidjan, Ivory Coast from August 28 to August 26, 2012.

Egypt was the champion and the tournament qualified the top four teams to the 2013 world championship.

== Draw ==
Group A	Group B
(Democratic Republic of the Congo) DR Congo; Gabon; Guinea; Ivory Coast; Tunisia	Algeria; Angola; Congo; Egypt; Libya

== Preliminary round ==
11 teams were drawn into two groups of five and six, respectively, with the two top teams of each group playing for the title, the two second, playing for the bronze medal, the two third, playing for the 5th place, the two fourth for the 7th place and the two fifth teams playing for the 9th place.

All times are local (UTC+1).

=== Group A ===
Team	Pld	W	D	L	GF	GA	GD	Pts
Tunisia	4	4	0	0	133	83	+50	8
Gabon	4	3	0	1	96	84	+12	6
(Democratic Republic of the Congo) DR Congo	4	2	0	2	104	102	+2	4
Ivory Coast	4	1	0	3	80	104	−24	2
Guinea	4	0	0	4	79	119	−40	0

21 August 2012; 13:00	Gabon	20 – 19	(Democratic Republic of the Congo) DR Congo	Palais des Sports de Treichville, Abidjan
21 August 2012; 13:00		(12–11)		Palais des Sports de Treichville, Abidjan

18:00	Guinea	18 – 20	Ivory Coast	Palais des Sports de Treichville, Abidjan
18:00		(9–8)		Palais des Sports de Treichville, Abidjan

22 August 2012; 12:00	Tunisia	39 – 25	(Democratic Republic of the Congo) DR Congo	Palais des Sports de Treichville, Abidjan
22 August 2012; 12:00		(23–13)		Palais des Sports de Treichville, Abidjan

14:00	Gabon	29 – 19	Guinea	Palais des Sports de Treichville, Abidjan
14:00		(10–5)		Palais des Sports de Treichville, Abidjan

23 August 2012; 10:00	DR Congo (Democratic Republic of the Congo)	33 – 21	Guinea	Palais des Sports de Treichville, Abidjan
23 August 2012; 10:00		(14–10)		Palais des Sports de Treichville, Abidjan

18:00	Ivory Coast	19 – 30	Tunisia	Palais des Sports de Treichville, Abidjan
18:00		(9–13)		Palais des Sports de Treichville, Abidjan

24 August 2012; 14:00	Tunisia	37 – 21	Guinea	Palais des Sports de Treichville, Abidjan
24 August 2012; 14:00		(19–11)		Palais des Sports de Treichville, Abidjan

18:00	Gabon	29 – 19	Ivory Coast	Palais des Sports de Treichville, Abidjan
18:00		(13–9)		Palais des Sports de Treichville, Abidjan

25 August 2012; 14:00	Tunisia	27 – 18	Gabon	Palais des Sports de Treichville, Abidjan
25 August 2012; 14:00		(14–12)		Palais des Sports de Treichville, Abidjan

18:00	Ivory Coast	22 – 27	(Democratic Republic of the Congo) DR Congo	Palais des Sports de Treichville, Abidjan
18:00		(13–8)		Palais des Sports de Treichville, Abidjan

=== Group B ===
Team	Pld	W	D	L	GF	GA	GD	Pts
Egypt	4	4	0	0	145	77	+68	8
Angola	4	3	0	1	115	103	+12	6
Libya	4	1	1	2	91	118	−27	3
Algeria	4	1	0	3	97	106	−9	2
Congo	4	0	1	3	91	135	−44	1

21 August 2012; 11:00	Algeria	27 – 20	Congo	Palais des Sports de Treichville, Abidjan
21 August 2012; 11:00		(14–8)		Palais des Sports de Treichville, Abidjan

15:00	Angola	22 – 34	Egypt	Palais des Sports de Treichville, Abidjan
15:00		(11–17)		Palais des Sports de Treichville, Abidjan

22 August 2012; 15:00	Congo	18 – 43	Egypt	Palais des Sports de Treichville, Abidjan
22 August 2012; 15:00		(7–19)		Palais des Sports de Treichville, Abidjan

17:00	Libya	27 – 23	Algeria	Palais des Sports de Treichville, Abidjan
17:00		(13–10)		Palais des Sports de Treichville, Abidjan

23 August 2012; 13:00	Libya	29 – 29	Congo	Palais des Sports de Treichville, Abidjan
23 August 2012; 13:00		(11–12)		Palais des Sports de Treichville, Abidjan

15:00	Algeria	26 – 31	Angola	Palais des Sports de Treichville, Abidjan
15:00		(16–14)		Palais des Sports de Treichville, Abidjan

24 August 2012; 11:00	Angola	36 – 24	Congo	Palais des Sports de Treichville, Abidjan
24 August 2012; 11:00		(20–10)		Palais des Sports de Treichville, Abidjan

15:00	Egypt	40 – 16	Libya	Palais des Sports de Treichville, Abidjan
15:00		(17–11)		Palais des Sports de Treichville, Abidjan

25 August 2012; 11:00	Angola	26 – 19	Libya	Palais des Sports de Treichville, Abidjan
25 August 2012; 11:00		(9–12)		Palais des Sports de Treichville, Abidjan

15:00	Egypt	28 – 21	Algeria	Palais des Sports de Treichville, Abidjan
15:00		(14–10)		Palais des Sports de Treichville, Abidjan

== Classification matches ==
=== 9th place game ===
26 August 2012; 09:00	Guinea	24 – 32	Congo	Palais des Sports de Treichville, Abidjan
26 August 2012; 09:00		(9–11)		Palais des Sports de Treichville, Abidjan

=== 7th place game ===
26 August 2012; 11:00	Ivory Coast	21 – 34	Algeria	Palais des Sports de Treichville, Abidjan
26 August 2012; 11:00		(10-13)		Palais des Sports de Treichville, Abidjan

=== 5th place game ===
26 August 2012; 13:00	DR Congo (Democratic Republic of the Congo)	30 – 32	Libya	Palais des Sports de Treichville, Abidjan
26 August 2012; 13:00		(15-19)		Palais des Sports de Treichville, Abidjan

=== Bronze medal game ===
26 August 2012; 15:00	Gabon	23 – 30	Angola	Palais des Sports de Treichville, Abidjan

=== Final ===
26 August 2012; 17:30	Egypt	27 – 22	Tunisia	Palais des Sports de Treichville, Abidjan
26 August 2012; 17:30		(11-9)		Palais des Sports de Treichville, Abidjan

== Final standings ==
Qualified for the 2013 World Championship

Rank	Team	Record
Gold medal	Egypt	5–0–0
Silver medal	Tunisia	4–0–1
Bronze medal	Angola	4–0–1
4	Gabon	3–0–2
5	Libya	2–1–2
6	(Democratic Republic of the Congo) DR Congo	3–0–2
7	Algeria	2–0–3
8	Ivory Coast	1–0–4
9	Congo	1–1–3
10	Guinea	0–0–5

== Awards ==
2012 African Men's Youth Handball Championship

Egypt
4th title

== See also ==
- 2012 African Men's Handball Championship
- 2012 African Men's Junior Handball Championship
