= 2022 African Men's Youth Handball Championship =

International handball competition

Tournament details
- Host country: Rwanda
- Venue: 1 (in 1 host city)
- Dates: 30 August – 6 September
- Teams: 8 (from 1 confederation)

Final positions
- Champions: Egypt (7th title)
- Runners-up: Rwanda
- Third place: Morocco
- Fourth place: Burundi

Tournament statistics
- Matches played: 17
- Goals scored: 1,213 (71.35 per match)

The 2022 African Men's Youth Handball Championship was held in Kigali, Rwanda from 30 August to 6 September 2022. It also acted as a qualification tournament for the 2023 Men's Youth World Handball Championship.

Egypt secured the title with a 51–29 win over Rwanda, while Morocco defeated Burundi 41–34 to claim the bronze medal. Burundi and Rwanda thus secured both their first-ever medals as well as their inaugural debut in the Men's Youth World Handball Championship.

== Draw ==
The draw was held on 22 July 2022 at the head office of the African Handball Confederation in Abidjan, Ivory Coast.

== Preliminary round ==
All times are local (UTC+2).

=== Group A ===
Pos	Team	Pld	W	D	L	GF	GA	GD	Pts	Qualification
1	Morocco	3	3	0	0	98	58	+40	6	Semifinals
2	Burundi	3	1	1	1	82	81	+1	3	Semifinals
3	Uganda	3	1	0	2	98	123	−25	2	Fifth place game
4	Libya	3	0	1	2	94	110	−16	1	Seventh place game

Rules for classification: 1) Points; 2) Head-to-head points; 3) Head-to-head goal difference; 4) Head-to-head goals scored; 5) Goal difference; 6) Goals scored; 7) Draw.

30 August 2022; 13:00	Libya	28–35	Uganda	BK Arena, Kigali
30 August 2022; 13:00		(10–11)		BK Arena, Kigali

Cancelled	Morocco	10–0	Burundi	BK Arena, Kigali

31 August 2022; 15:00	Burundi	32–32	Libya	BK Arena, Kigali
31 August 2022; 15:00		(14–16)		BK Arena, Kigali

31 August 2022; 17:00	Morocco	45–24	Uganda	BK Arena, Kigali
31 August 2022; 17:00		(22–11)		BK Arena, Kigali

2 September 2022; 13:00	Uganda	39–50	Burundi	BK Arena, Kigali
2 September 2022; 13:00		(22–24)		BK Arena, Kigali

2 September 2022; 17:00	Morocco	43–34	Libya	BK Arena, Kigali
2 September 2022; 17:00		(15–21)		BK Arena, Kigali

=== Group B ===
Pos	Team	Pld	W	D	L	GF	GA	GD	Pts	Qualification
1	Egypt	3	3	0	0	151	63	+88	6	Semifinals
2	Rwanda (H)	3	1	1	1	113	106	+7	3	Semifinals
3	Algeria	3	1	1	1	91	92	−1	3	Fifth place game
4	Madagascar	3	0	0	3	65	159	−94	0	Seventh place game

Rules for classification: 1) Points; 2) Head-to-head points; 3) Head-to-head goal difference; 4) Head-to-head goals scored; 5) Goal difference; 6) Goals scored; 7) Draw.
(H) Hosts

30 August 2022; 17:00	Egypt	43–19	Algeria	BK Arena, Kigali
30 August 2022; 17:00		(21–10)		BK Arena, Kigali

30 August 2022; 19:00	Rwanda	53–32	Madagascar	BK Arena, Kigali
30 August 2022; 19:00		(26–13)		BK Arena, Kigali

31 August 2022; 13:00	Algeria	42–19	Madagascar	BK Arena, Kigali
31 August 2022; 13:00		(22–5)		BK Arena, Kigali

31 August 2022; 19:00	Egypt	44–30	Rwanda	BK Arena, Kigali
31 August 2022; 19:00		(19–15)		BK Arena, Kigali

2 September 2022; 15:00	Egypt	64–14	Madagascar	BK Arena, Kigali
2 September 2022; 15:00		(28–9)		BK Arena, Kigali

2 September 2022; 19:00	Rwanda	30–30	Algeria	BK Arena, Kigali
2 September 2022; 19:00		(13–13)		BK Arena, Kigali

== Knockout stage ==
=== Bracket ===
Semifinals
4 September
Morocco	34
Rwanda	35
4 September
Egypt	66
Burundi	22

Final
6 September
Rwanda	29
Egypt	51
Third place
6 September
Morocco	41
Burundi	34

=== Semifinals ===
4 September 2022; 17:00	Egypt	66–22	Burundi	BK Arena, Kigali
4 September 2022; 17:00		(34–12)		BK Arena, Kigali

4 September 2022; 19:00	Morocco	34–35	Rwanda	BK Arena, Kigali
4 September 2022; 19:00		(14–18)		BK Arena, Kigali

=== Seventh place game ===
5 September 2022; 17:00	Libya	24–20	Madagascar	BK Arena, Kigali
5 September 2022; 17:00		(14–11)		BK Arena, Kigali

=== Fifth place game ===
5 September 2022; 19:00	Uganda	31–44	Algeria	BK Arena, Kigali
5 September 2022; 19:00		(11–22)		BK Arena, Kigali

=== Third place game ===
6 September 2022; 17:00	Morocco	41–34	Burundi	BK Arena, Kigali
6 September 2022; 17:00		(21–15)		BK Arena, Kigali

=== Final ===
6 September 2022; 19:00	Rwanda	29–51	Egypt	BK Arena, Kigali
6 September 2022; 19:00		(16–22)		BK Arena, Kigali

== Final standings ==
Rank	Team
1st place, gold medalist(s)	Egypt
2nd place, silver medalist(s)	Rwanda
3rd place, bronze medalist(s)	Morocco
4	Burundi
5	Algeria
6	Uganda
7	Libya
8	Madagascar

Team qualified for the 2023 Youth World Championship
