= Syria men's national youth handball team =

Under–18 handball team of Syria

Syria

Information
- Nickname: Nosour Qasioun (Arabic: نسور قاسيون, lit. 'Qasioun Eagles')
- Association: Syrian Arab Handball Federation

Colours
1st	2nd

Results

IHF U-19 World Championship
- Appearances: none

Asian Youth Championship
- Appearances: 3 (First in 2012)
- Best result: 7th (2012)
- Last updated on 24 September 2026.

The Syrian national youth handball team is the national under–18 handball team of Syria. It is controlled by the Syrian Arab Handball Federation, and is an affiliate of the International Handball Federation as well as a member of the Asian Handball Federation. The team represents Syria in international matches.

== Tournament record ==
=== Youth Olympic Games ===
Champions Runners up Third place Fourth place

Youth Olympic Games record
Year	Round	Position	GP	W	D	L	GS	GA	GD
(Singapore) 2010	Did not qualify								
(China) 2014	Did not qualify								
(Argentina) 2018	No handball event								
(Senegal) 2022	No handball event								
Total	0 / 2	0 Titles							

=== Asian Championship record ===
Champions Runners up Third place Fourth place

Year	Round	Position	GP	W	D*	L	GS	GA	GD
(Thailand) 2005	Did not qualify								
(Iran) 2006	Did not qualify								
(Jordan) 2008	Did not qualify								
(United Arab Emirates) 2010	Did not qualify								
(Bahrain) 2012	quarter-finals	7th place	5	2	0	3	182	201	-20
(Jordan) 2014	Did not qualify								
(Bahrain) 2016	Did not qualify								
(Jordan) 2018	group stage	12th place	5	0	0	5	153	190	-37
(Kazakhstan) 2020	Tournament canceled								
(Bahrain) 2022	Did not qualify								
(Jordan) 2024	Did not qualify								
(Jordan) 2026		9th place							
Total	3 / 11	0 Titles	10	2	0	8	335	351	-57
