= Ali Ishaqi =

Bahraini politician

- علي إسحاقي

Member of the Council of Representatives (Bahrain)
- Incumbent
- Assumed office 2018
- Monarch: Hamad bin Isa Al Khalifa
- Prime Minister: Khalifa bin Salman Al Khalifa, Salman, Crown Prince of Bahrain
- Preceded by: Nabil Al Balushi
- Parliamentary group: independent

Personal details
- Born: Ali Muhammad Issa Abdullah Ishaqi
- Occupation: handball player and executive

Ali Muhammad Issa Abdullah Ishaqi (Arabic: علي محمد عيسى عبد الله إسحاقي) is a Bahraini politician and sportsperson. He was sworn into the Council of Representatives on December 12, 2018 to represent the Tenth District of the Capital Governorate.

== Sports career ==
Ishaqi was elected president of the Bahrain Handball Federation and is a member of the Bahrain Olympic Committee. In 2013, he was elected to the Board of Directors of the Asian Handball Federation. In 2017, he was elected the Asian Handball Federation’s Vice-President.

He played for the Bahrain men's national handball team during a period in which they qualified for the World Men's Handball Championship four times: 2011, 2015, 2017, and 2019. They also finished as runner-up in the Asian Men's Handball Championship in 2010, 2014, 2016, and 2018. He won two medals at the Asian Games, including a silver in 2018 and a bronze in 2014. In addition, the youth team qualified for the World Men’s Youth Championship for the first time in 2017 and won the Asian Men's Youth Handball Championship twice in 2016 and 2018.

== Political career ==
In the 2018 Bahraini general election, he ran to represent the Tenth District of the Capital Governorate in the Council of Representatives. By winning 2,689 votes for 38.95% in the first round on November 24, he advanced to the runoff on December 1, in which he defeated Eman Showaiter (Progressive Democratic Tribune) with 3,279 votes for 55.93%.
