= 2014 Asian Men's Youth Handball Championship =

2014 handball championship in Asia

Tournament details
- Host country: Jordan
- Dates: 6–15 September 2014
- Teams: 9 (from 1 confederation)

Final positions
- Champions: South Korea (2nd title)
- Runners-up: Qatar
- Third place: Japan
- Fourth place: Bahrain

The 2014 Asian Men's Youth Handball Championship was the 6th edition of the Asian Men's Youth Handball Championship which was held from 6–15 September 2014 at Amman, Jordan under aegis of Asian Handball Federation. The tournament also acted as the qualification tournament for the 2015 Men's Youth World Handball Championship.

South Korea won its 2nd Youth Men's title by beating Qatar in the final by 26–25 (Half Time 14–13).

== Draw ==
Group A	Group B
Iran	Iraq
Saudi Arabia	South Korea
Bahrain	Japan
Qatar	Jordan
Kuwait	

== Group A ==
Qatar 4/0/0 106–80 +26

Bahrain 2/1/1 99–91 +8

Kuwait 1/2/1 103–104 -1

Iran 1/1/2 97–113 -16

Saudi Arabia 0/0/4 90–107 -17

6 September 2014; 15:00	Saudi Arabia	21-24	Qatar	Amman, Jordan
6 September 2014; 15:00		(12-16)		Amman, Jordan

6 September 2014; 19:00	Kuwait	24-24	Iran	Amman, Jordan
6 September 2014; 19:00		(10-10)		Amman, Jordan

7 September 2014; 15:00	Qatar	35-22	Iran	Amman, Jordan
7 September 2014; 15:00		(14-10)		Amman, Jordan

7 September 2014; 19:00	Saudi Arabia	19-21	Bahrain	Amman, Jordan
7 September 2014; 19:00		(11-12)		Amman, Jordan

8 September 2014; 15:00	Bahrain	31-31	Kuwait	Amman, Jordan
8 September 2014; 15:00		(17-14)		Amman, Jordan

8 September 2014; 19:00	Iran	33-25	Saudi Arabia	Amman, Jordan
8 September 2014; 19:00		(18-13)		Amman, Jordan

10 September 2014; 15:00	Bahrain	29-18	Iran	Amman, Jordan
10 September 2014; 15:00		(18-7)		Amman, Jordan

10 September 2014; 19:00	Kuwait	19-24	Qatar	Amman, Jordan
10 September 2014; 19:00		(11-12)		Amman, Jordan

11 September 2014; 15:00	Kuwait	29-25	Saudi Arabia	Amman, Jordan
11 September 2014; 15:00		(14-14)		Amman, Jordan

11 September 2014; 19:00	Qatar	23-18	Bahrain	Amman, Jordan
11 September 2014; 19:00		(9-11)		Amman, Jordan

== Group B ==
South Korea 3/0/0 110–72 +38

Japan 2/0/1 103–69 +34

Iraq 1/0/2 76–81 -5

Jordan 0/0/3 46–113 -67

6 September 2014; 17:00	Iraq	22-32	Japan	Amman, Jordan
6 September 2014; 17:00		(14-15)		Amman, Jordan

7 September 2014; 17:00	Iraq	19-34	South Korea	Amman, Jordan
7 September 2014; 17:00		(6-17)		Amman, Jordan

8 September 2014; 17:00	South Korea	40-20	Jordan	Amman, Jordan
8 September 2014; 17:00		(19-8)		Amman, Jordan

10 September 2014; 17:00	Jordan	11-38	Japan	Amman, Jordan
10 September 2014; 17:00		(3-20)		Amman, Jordan

11 September 2014; 17:00	Jordan	15-35	Iraq	Amman, Jordan
11 September 2014; 17:00		(5-18)		Amman, Jordan

11 September 2014; 21:00	Japan	33-36	South Korea	Amman, Jordan
11 September 2014; 21:00		(18-15)		Amman, Jordan

== Placement matches ==
5th/8th Placement Matches
13 September 2015
Kuwait	28
Jordan	18
13 September 2015
Iraq	27
Iran	21

5th/6th-place match
14 September 2015
Kuwait	28
Iraq	26
7th/8th-place match
14 September 2015
Jordan	21
Iran	41

13 September 2014; 13:00	Kuwait	28-18	Jordan	Amman, Jordan
13 September 2014; 13:00		(10-7)		Amman, Jordan

13 September 2014; 15:00	Iraq	27-21	Iran	Amman, Jordan
13 September 2014; 15:00		(14-11)		Amman, Jordan

=== 7/8-place match ===
14 September 2014; 13:00	Jordan	21-41	Iran	Amman, Jordan
14 September 2014; 13:00		(5-20)		Amman, Jordan

=== 5/6-place match ===
14 September 2014; 15:00	Kuwait	28-26	Iraq	Amman, Jordan
14 September 2014; 15:00		(16-13)		Amman, Jordan

== Knockout stage ==
Semifinals
13 September 2015
Qatar	26
Japan	19
13 September 2015
South Korea	30
Bahrain	26

Final
15 September 2015
South Korea	26
Qatar	25
Third-place game
15 September 2015
Bahrain	23
Japan	31

=== Semifinal matches ===
13 September 2014; 19:00	South Korea	30-26	Bahrain	Amman, Jordan
13 September 2014; 19:00		(10-10)		Amman, Jordan

13 September 2014; 17:00	Qatar	26-19	Japan	Amman, Jordan
13 September 2014; 17:00		(11-13)		Amman, Jordan

=== Bronze-medal match ===
15 September 2014; 16:00	Japan	31-23	Bahrain	Amman, Jordan
15 September 2014; 16:00		(16-9)		Amman, Jordan

=== Gold-medal match ===
15 September 2014; 18:00	Qatar	25-26	South Korea	Amman, Jordan
15 September 2014; 18:00		(13-14)		Amman, Jordan

== Final standings ==
Rank	Team
1st place, gold medalist(s)	South Korea
2nd place, silver medalist(s)	Qatar
3rd place, bronze medalist(s)	Japan
4	Bahrain
5	Kuwait
6	Iraq
7	Iran
8	Jordan
9	Saudi Arabia

Team qualified for the 2015 Youth World Championship
