= 2024 Asian Men's Youth Handball Championship =

Tournament details
- Host country: Jordan
- Venue: 1 (in 1 host city)
- Dates: 3–14 September
- Teams: 13 (from 1 confederation)

Final positions
- Champions: Japan (1st title)
- Runners-up: South Korea
- Third place: Kuwait
- Fourth place: Saudi Arabia

Tournament statistics
- Matches played: 42
- Goals scored: 2,313 (55.07 per match)

Awards
- Best player: (Japan) Masato Ohashi

The 2024 Asian Men's Youth Handball Championship was the 10th edition of the championship held from 3 to 14 September 2024 in Amman, Jordan under the aegis of Asian Handball Federation. It was the third time in history that the championship was organised by the Jordan Handball Federation. It also acted as the qualification tournament for the 2025 IHF Men's U19 Handball World Championship. Top five teams from the championship directly qualified for the Youth World Championship to be held in Egypt.

The championship was previously scheduled to be held in Shiraz, Iran but was moved to Amman due to the security situation and safety concerns in Iran.

== Draw ==
The draw was held on 15 August 2024 at 17:00 at the headquarters of the Jordan Handball Federation in Amman, Jordan.

=== Seeding ===
Teams were seeded according to the AHF COC regulations and rankings of the previous edition of the championship. Teams who had not participate in the previous edition were in Pot 4.

Pot 1	Pot 2	Pot 3	Pot 4
Iran; Jordan (host); Saudi Arabia; South Korea	Bahrain; Japan; Kuwait; Qatar	India; Iraq; United Arab Emirates	China; Chinese Taipei

== Preliminary round ==
All times are local (UTC+3).

=== Group A ===
Pos	Team	Pld	W	D	L	GF	GA	GD	Pts	Qualification
1	South Korea	2	2	0	0	56	46	+10	4	Main round
2	Bahrain	2	1	0	1	54	56	−2	2	Main round
3	Iraq	2	0	0	2	47	55	−8	0	Martyr Fahad Al-Ahmad Al-Sabah Cup

Source: AHF
Rules for classification: 1) Points; 2) Head-to-head points; 3) Head-to-head goal difference; 4) Head-to-head goals scored; 5) Goal difference; 6) Goals scored; 7) Draw.

3 September 2024; 19:00	Iraq	20–27	South Korea	Princess Sumaya Hall, Amman; Referees: Al-Shaib, Al-Naemi (QAT)
3 September 2024; 19:00	Kadhim 6	(8–13)	Kang Jun. 5	Princess Sumaya Hall, Amman; Referees: Al-Shaib, Al-Naemi (QAT)
3 September 2024; 19:00	9× (suspension)	Report	6× (suspension)	Princess Sumaya Hall, Amman; Referees: Al-Shaib, Al-Naemi (QAT)

4 September 2024; 15:30	Bahrain	28–27	Iraq	Princess Sumaya Hall, Amman; Referees: Al-Humod, Al-Turki (KSA)
4 September 2024; 15:30	Al-Showikh 8	(15–14)	Abdullah 11	Princess Sumaya Hall, Amman; Referees: Al-Humod, Al-Turki (KSA)
4 September 2024; 15:30	2× (suspension)	Report	7× (suspension)	Princess Sumaya Hall, Amman; Referees: Al-Humod, Al-Turki (KSA)

5 September 2024; 12:00	South Korea	29–26	Bahrain	Princess Sumaya Hall, Amman; Referees: Yazdanian, Rezaei (IRI)
5 September 2024; 12:00	Cho 9	(14–11)	Yusuf 11	Princess Sumaya Hall, Amman; Referees: Yazdanian, Rezaei (IRI)
5 September 2024; 12:00	1× (suspension)	Report	6× (suspension)	Princess Sumaya Hall, Amman; Referees: Yazdanian, Rezaei (IRI)

=== Group B ===
Pos	Team	Pld	W	D	L	GF	GA	GD	Pts	Qualification
1	Japan	2	2	0	0	79	34	+45	4	Main round
2	Jordan (H)	2	1	0	1	54	42	+12	2	Main round
3	India	2	0	0	2	24	81	−57	0	Martyr Fahad Al-Ahmad Al-Sabah Cup

Source: AHF
Rules for classification: 1) Points; 2) Head-to-head points; 3) Head-to-head goal difference; 4) Head-to-head goals scored; 5) Goal difference; 6) Goals scored; 7) Draw.
(H) Hosts

3 September 2024; 17:15	Japan	49–12	India	Princess Sumaya Hall, Amman; Referees: Mozafari, Mazaheri (IRI)
3 September 2024; 17:15	Kitagawa 8	(25–8)	Gnanasegaran 6	Princess Sumaya Hall, Amman; Referees: Mozafari, Mazaheri (IRI)
3 September 2024; 17:15	1× (suspension)	Report	1× (suspension)	Princess Sumaya Hall, Amman; Referees: Mozafari, Mazaheri (IRI)

4 September 2024; 19:00	India	12–32	Jordan	Princess Sumaya Hall, Amman; Referees: Kim, Kwon (KOR)
4 September 2024; 19:00	Gnanasegaran 4	(4–15)	A. Obeidat 8	Princess Sumaya Hall, Amman; Referees: Kim, Kwon (KOR)
4 September 2024; 19:00	3× (suspension)	Report	1× (suspension)	Princess Sumaya Hall, Amman; Referees: Kim, Kwon (KOR)

5 September 2024; 19:00	Jordan	22–30	Japan	Princess Sumaya Hall, Amman; Referees: Al-Naseem, Al-Enezi (KUW)
5 September 2024; 19:00	A. Obeidat 6	(11–10)	Ohashi 9	Princess Sumaya Hall, Amman; Referees: Al-Naseem, Al-Enezi (KUW)
5 September 2024; 19:00	3× (suspension)	Report	5× (suspension)	Princess Sumaya Hall, Amman; Referees: Al-Naseem, Al-Enezi (KUW)

=== Group C ===
Pos	Team	Pld	W	D	L	GF	GA	GD	Pts	Qualification
1	Saudi Arabia	2	2	0	0	88	40	+48	4	Main round
2	Qatar	2	1	0	1	57	64	−7	2	Main round
3	United Arab Emirates	2	0	0	2	35	76	−41	0	Martyr Fahad Al-Ahmad Al-Sabah Cup

Source: AHF
Rules for classification: 1) Points; 2) Head-to-head points; 3) Head-to-head goal difference; 4) Head-to-head goals scored; 5) Goal difference; 6) Goals scored; 7) Draw.

3 September 2024; 15:30	United Arab Emirates	14–45	Saudi Arabia	Princess Sumaya Hall, Amman; Referees: Wang, Wu (CHN)
3 September 2024; 15:30	Al-Maazmi 4	(9–20)	Al-Obaidi, Al-Suni 8	Princess Sumaya Hall, Amman; Referees: Wang, Wu (CHN)
3 September 2024; 15:30	5× (suspension)	Report	3× (suspension)	Princess Sumaya Hall, Amman; Referees: Wang, Wu (CHN)

4 September 2024; 12:00	Qatar	31–21	United Arab Emirates	Princess Sumaya Hall, Amman; Referees: Al-Naseem, Al-Enezi (KUW)
4 September 2024; 12:00	Dridi 10	(16–10)	R. Al Ali 5	Princess Sumaya Hall, Amman; Referees: Al-Naseem, Al-Enezi (KUW)
4 September 2024; 12:00	4× (suspension)	Report	3× (suspension) 2× (red card)	Princess Sumaya Hall, Amman; Referees: Al-Naseem, Al-Enezi (KUW)

5 September 2024; 17:15	Saudi Arabia	43–26	Qatar	Princess Sumaya Hall, Amman; Referees: Al-Rashed, Abo Asi (JOR)
5 September 2024; 17:15	Al-Obaidi 9	(20–11)	Dridi 7	Princess Sumaya Hall, Amman; Referees: Al-Rashed, Abo Asi (JOR)
5 September 2024; 17:15	4× (suspension)	Report	5× (suspension)	Princess Sumaya Hall, Amman; Referees: Al-Rashed, Abo Asi (JOR)

=== Group D ===
Pos	Team	Pld	W	D	L	GF	GA	GD	Pts	Qualification
1	Kuwait	3	3	0	0	94	79	+15	6	Main round
2	Iran	3	1	1	1	80	76	+4	3	Main round
3	Chinese Taipei	3	1	1	1	93	97	−4	3	Martyr Fahad Al-Ahmad Al-Sabah Cup
4	China	3	0	0	3	79	94	−15	0	Martyr Fahad Al-Ahmad Al-Sabah Cup

Source: AHF
Rules for classification: 1) Points; 2) Head-to-head points; 3) Head-to-head goal difference; 4) Head-to-head goals scored; 5) Goal difference; 6) Goals scored; 7) Draw.

3 September 2024; 12:00	Chinese Taipei	31–37	Kuwait	Princess Sumaya Hall, Amman; Referees: Ahmed, Ebrahim (BHR)
3 September 2024; 12:00	Lu T. 12	(12–18)	Mandani 8	Princess Sumaya Hall, Amman; Referees: Ahmed, Ebrahim (BHR)
3 September 2024; 12:00	4× (suspension)	Report	5× (suspension)	Princess Sumaya Hall, Amman; Referees: Ahmed, Ebrahim (BHR)

3 September 2024; 13:45	China	23–28	Iran	Princess Sumaya Hall, Amman; Referees: Kim, Kwon (KOR)
3 September 2024; 13:45	Li Z. 8	(11–15)	Elmikhah 6	Princess Sumaya Hall, Amman; Referees: Kim, Kwon (KOR)
3 September 2024; 13:45	1× (suspension)	Report	1× (suspension)	Princess Sumaya Hall, Amman; Referees: Kim, Kwon (KOR)

4 September 2024; 13:45	China	24–32	Kuwait	Princess Sumaya Hall, Amman; Referees: Al-Rashed, Abo Asi (JOR)
4 September 2024; 13:45	Wei 8	(10–19)	Madwah 9	Princess Sumaya Hall, Amman; Referees: Al-Rashed, Abo Asi (JOR)
4 September 2024; 13:45	5× (suspension)	Report	4× (suspension)	Princess Sumaya Hall, Amman; Referees: Al-Rashed, Abo Asi (JOR)

4 September 2024; 17:15	Chinese Taipei	28–28	Iran	Princess Sumaya Hall, Amman; Referees: Imonboev, Akhmedov (UZB)
4 September 2024; 17:15	Yang 11	(11–13)	Enayati 8	Princess Sumaya Hall, Amman; Referees: Imonboev, Akhmedov (UZB)
4 September 2024; 17:15	2× (suspension)	Report	3× (suspension) 2× (red card)	Princess Sumaya Hall, Amman; Referees: Imonboev, Akhmedov (UZB)

5 September 2024; 13:45	Chinese Taipei	34–32	China	Princess Sumaya Hall, Amman; Referees: Al-Shaib, Al-Naemi (QAT)
5 September 2024; 13:45	Yang 9	(16–13)	Li Z. 13	Princess Sumaya Hall, Amman; Referees: Al-Shaib, Al-Naemi (QAT)
5 September 2024; 13:45	1× (suspension)	Report		Princess Sumaya Hall, Amman; Referees: Al-Shaib, Al-Naemi (QAT)

5 September 2024; 15:30	Iran	24–25	Kuwait	Princess Sumaya Hall, Amman; Referees: Al-Humod, Al-Turki (KSA)
5 September 2024; 15:30	Kasiri 6	(14–12)	Mandni 6	Princess Sumaya Hall, Amman; Referees: Al-Humod, Al-Turki (KSA)
5 September 2024; 15:30	7× (suspension)	Report	2× (suspension)	Princess Sumaya Hall, Amman; Referees: Al-Humod, Al-Turki (KSA)

== Martyr Fahad Al-Ahmad Al-Sabah Cup ==
=== Group III ===
Pos	Team	Pld	W	D	L	GF	GA	GD	Pts
9	Chinese Taipei	4	4	0	0	133	76	+57	8
10	Iraq	4	3	0	1	100	76	+24	6
11	China	4	2	0	2	114	100	+14	4
12	United Arab Emirates	4	1	0	3	85	123	−38	2
13	India	4	0	0	4	49	106	−57	0

Source: AHF
Rules for classification: 1) Points; 2) Head-to-head points; 3) Head-to-head goal difference; 4) Head-to-head goals scored; 5) Goal difference; 6) Goals scored; 7) Draw.

7 September 2024; 11:00	Chinese Taipei	40–14	India	Princess Sumaya Hall, Amman
7 September 2024; 11:00		(19–7)		Princess Sumaya Hall, Amman
7 September 2024; 11:00		Report		Princess Sumaya Hall, Amman

7 September 2024; 12:45	China	24–30	Iraq	Princess Sumaya Hall, Amman
7 September 2024; 12:45		(9–13)		Princess Sumaya Hall, Amman
7 September 2024; 12:45		Report		Princess Sumaya Hall, Amman

8 September 2024; 13:00	United Arab Emirates	26–20	India	Princess Sumaya Hall, Amman
8 September 2024; 13:00		(12–14)		Princess Sumaya Hall, Amman
8 September 2024; 13:00		Report		Princess Sumaya Hall, Amman

8 September 2024; 14:45	Chinese Taipei	30–29	Iraq	Princess Sumaya Hall, Amman
8 September 2024; 14:45		(14–16)		Princess Sumaya Hall, Amman
8 September 2024; 14:45		Report		Princess Sumaya Hall, Amman

9 September 2024; 13:00	United Arab Emirates	15–30	Chinese Taipei	Princess Sumaya Hall, Amman
9 September 2024; 13:00		(6–13)		Princess Sumaya Hall, Amman
9 September 2024; 13:00		Report		Princess Sumaya Hall, Amman

9 September 2024; 14:45	India	15–30	China	Princess Sumaya Hall, Amman
9 September 2024; 14:45		(5–14)		Princess Sumaya Hall, Amman
9 September 2024; 14:45		Report		Princess Sumaya Hall, Amman

12 September 2024; 13:00	China	18–33	Chinese Taipei	Princess Sumaya Hall, Amman
12 September 2024; 13:00		(11–19)		Princess Sumaya Hall, Amman
12 September 2024; 13:00		Report		Princess Sumaya Hall, Amman

12 September 2024; 14:45	United Arab Emirates	22–31	Iraq	Princess Sumaya Hall, Amman
12 September 2024; 14:45		(11–15)		Princess Sumaya Hall, Amman
12 September 2024; 14:45		Report		Princess Sumaya Hall, Amman

13 September 2024; 13:00	Iraq	10–0 (Forfeit)	India	Princess Sumaya Hall, Amman
13 September 2024; 13:00		Report		Princess Sumaya Hall, Amman

13 September 2024; 14:45	China	42–22	United Arab Emirates	Princess Sumaya Hall, Amman
13 September 2024; 14:45		(19–13)		Princess Sumaya Hall, Amman
13 September 2024; 14:45		Report		Princess Sumaya Hall, Amman

== Main round ==
=== Group I ===
Pos	Team	Pld	W	D	L	GF	GA	GD	Pts	Qualification
1	Saudi Arabia	3	2	1	0	84	70	+14	5	Semifinals
2	South Korea	3	2	0	1	82	66	+16	4	Semifinals
3	Iran	3	1	1	1	75	80	−5	3	Fifth place game
4	Jordan (H)	3	0	0	3	63	88	−25	0	Seventh place game

Source: AHF
Rules for classification: 1) Points; 2) Head-to-head points; 3) Head-to-head goal difference; 4) Head-to-head goals scored; 5) Goal difference; 6) Goals scored; 7) Draw.
(H) Hosts

7 September 2024; 14:30	Iran	22–30	South Korea	Princess Sumaya Hall, Amman
7 September 2024; 14:30		(10–12)		Princess Sumaya Hall, Amman
7 September 2024; 14:30		Report		Princess Sumaya Hall, Amman

7 September 2024; 16:15	Saudi Arabia	33–20	Jordan	Princess Sumaya Hall, Amman
7 September 2024; 16:15		(19–9)		Princess Sumaya Hall, Amman
7 September 2024; 16:15		Report		Princess Sumaya Hall, Amman

8 September 2024; 16:30	South Korea	28–19	Jordan	Princess Sumaya Hall, Amman
8 September 2024; 16:30		(13–11)		Princess Sumaya Hall, Amman
8 September 2024; 16:30		Report		Princess Sumaya Hall, Amman

8 September 2024; 18:15	Iran	26–26	Saudi Arabia	Princess Sumaya Hall, Amman
8 September 2024; 18:15		(10–13)		Princess Sumaya Hall, Amman
8 September 2024; 18:15		Report		Princess Sumaya Hall, Amman

11 September 2024; 13:00	Jordan	24–27	Iran	Princess Sumaya Hall, Amman
11 September 2024; 13:00		(8–13)		Princess Sumaya Hall, Amman
11 September 2024; 13:00		Report		Princess Sumaya Hall, Amman

11 September 2024; 16:30	South Korea	24–25	Saudi Arabia	Princess Sumaya Hall, Amman
11 September 2024; 16:30		(14–14)		Princess Sumaya Hall, Amman
11 September 2024; 16:30		Report		Princess Sumaya Hall, Amman

=== Group II ===
Pos	Team	Pld	W	D	L	GF	GA	GD	Pts	Qualification
1	Kuwait	3	2	0	1	92	86	+6	4 (Note: Kuwait 2 Pts, +2 GD, 60 GS; Japan 2 Pts, +2 GD, 47 GS; Bahrain 2 Pts, –4 GD)	Semifinals
2	Japan	3	2	0	1	86	65	+21	4	Semifinals
3	Bahrain	3	2	0	1	86	84	+2	4	Fifth place game
4	Qatar	3	0	0	3	75	104	−29	0	Seventh place game

Source: AHF
Rules for classification: 1) Points; 2) Head-to-head points; 3) Head-to-head goal difference; 4) Head-to-head goals scored; 5) Goal difference; 6) Goals scored; 7) Draw.
Notes:

7 September 2024; 18:00	Qatar	20–39	Japan	Princess Sumaya Hall, Amman
7 September 2024; 18:00		(10–18)		Princess Sumaya Hall, Amman
7 September 2024; 18:00		Report		Princess Sumaya Hall, Amman

7 September 2024; 19:45	Kuwait	33–35	Bahrain	Princess Sumaya Hall, Amman
7 September 2024; 19:45		(15–18)		Princess Sumaya Hall, Amman
7 September 2024; 19:45		Report		Princess Sumaya Hall, Amman

9 September 2024; 16:30	Kuwait	32–28	Qatar	Princess Sumaya Hall, Amman
9 September 2024; 16:30		(12–12)		Princess Sumaya Hall, Amman
9 September 2024; 16:30		Report		Princess Sumaya Hall, Amman

9 September 2024; 18:15	Bahrain	18–24	Japan	Princess Sumaya Hall, Amman
9 September 2024; 18:15		(6–10)		Princess Sumaya Hall, Amman
9 September 2024; 18:15		Report		Princess Sumaya Hall, Amman

11 September 2024; 14:45	Bahrain	33–27	Qatar	Princess Sumaya Hall, Amman
11 September 2024; 14:45		(18–16)		Princess Sumaya Hall, Amman
11 September 2024; 14:45		Report		Princess Sumaya Hall, Amman

11 September 2024; 18:15	Japan	23–27	Kuwait	Princess Sumaya Hall, Amman
11 September 2024; 18:15		(12–16)		Princess Sumaya Hall, Amman
11 September 2024; 18:15		Report		Princess Sumaya Hall, Amman

== Knockout stage ==
=== Bracket ===
Semifinals
12 September
Saudi Arabia	27
Japan	30
12 September
Kuwait	24
South Korea	36

Final
14 September
Japan	26
South Korea	24
Third place
14 September
Saudi Arabia	26
Kuwait	30

=== Seventh place game ===
13 September 2024; 16:30	Jordan	32–20	Qatar	Princess Sumaya Hall, Amman
13 September 2024; 16:30		(17–13)		Princess Sumaya Hall, Amman
13 September 2024; 16:30		Report		Princess Sumaya Hall, Amman

=== Fifth place game ===
13 September 2024
18:15
Iran
39–45 (ET)
Bahrain
Princess Sumaya Hall, Amman

(19–20)

Report

FT: 37–37 ET: 2–8

=== Semifinals ===
12 September 2024; 16:30	Saudi Arabia	27–30	Japan	Princess Sumaya Hall, Amman; Referees: Wu, Wang (CHN)
12 September 2024; 16:30	Al-Obaidi 9	(13–17)	Ohashi 11	Princess Sumaya Hall, Amman; Referees: Wu, Wang (CHN)
12 September 2024; 16:30	1× (yellow card) 1× (suspension)	Report	4× (suspension)	Princess Sumaya Hall, Amman; Referees: Wu, Wang (CHN)

12 September 2024; 18:30	Kuwait	24–36	South Korea	Princess Sumaya Hall, Amman; Referees: Yazdanian, Rezaei (IRI)
12 September 2024; 18:30	Salmin 7	(12–17)	Cho 13	Princess Sumaya Hall, Amman; Referees: Yazdanian, Rezaei (IRI)
12 September 2024; 18:30	1× (yellow card) 3× (suspension)	Report	1× (suspension)	Princess Sumaya Hall, Amman; Referees: Yazdanian, Rezaei (IRI)

=== Third place game ===
14 September 2024; 16:00	Saudi Arabia	26–30	Kuwait	Princess Sumaya Hall, Amman; Referees: Kim, Kwon (KOR)
14 September 2024; 16:00	Al-Ramdan 7	(17–18)	Madwah 9	Princess Sumaya Hall, Amman; Referees: Kim, Kwon (KOR)
14 September 2024; 16:00	2× (suspension)	Report	3× (suspension)	Princess Sumaya Hall, Amman; Referees: Kim, Kwon (KOR)

=== Final ===
14 September 2024; 18:00	Japan	26–24	South Korea	Princess Sumaya Hall, Amman; Referees: Al-Enezi, Al-Naseem (KUW)
14 September 2024; 18:00	Furusawa 9	(15–9)	Ju 6	Princess Sumaya Hall, Amman; Referees: Al-Enezi, Al-Naseem (KUW)
14 September 2024; 18:00	1× (suspension)	Report	1× (suspension)	Princess Sumaya Hall, Amman; Referees: Al-Enezi, Al-Naseem (KUW)

== Final standings ==
Rank	Team
1st place, gold medalist(s)	Japan
2nd place, silver medalist(s)	South Korea
3rd place, bronze medalist(s)	Kuwait
4	Saudi Arabia
5	Bahrain
6	Iran
7	Jordan
8	Qatar
9	Chinese Taipei
10	Iraq
11	China
12	United Arab Emirates
13	India

Team qualified for the 2025 U19 World Championship

== All Star Team ==
Position	Player
Goalkeeper	(South Korea) Hong Ui-seok
Right wing	(Bahrain) Salman Al-Showikh
Right back	(Kuwait) Abdullatif Salmin
Centre back	(Saudi Arabia) Ahmed Al-Obaidi
Left back	(Japan) Sora Furusawa
Left wing	(Japan) Kaisei Nanjo
Pivot	(South Korea) Choe Do-hun
MVP	(Japan) Masato Ohashi
