= Bahrain Handball Federation =

Governing body of handball in Bahrain

Bahrain Handball Federation Arabic: اتحاد البحرين لكرة اليد BHF
- IOC nation: Kingdom of Bahrain (BHR)
- Sport: Handball
- Other sports: Beach Handball

HISTORY
- Year of formation: December 1974; 50 years ago

AFFILIATIONS
- International federation: International Handball Federation (IHF)
- IHF member since: 1978
- Continental association: Asian Handball Federation (AHF)
- National Olympic Committee: Bahrain Olympic Committee

GOVERNING BODY
- President: Ali Mohamed Isa Eshaqi (Bahrain)

HEADQUARTERS
- Address: Building 25, Road 6, Block 337, Al-Mahooz Avenue, Manama
- Country: Bahrain
- Secretary General: Majdi Merza (Bahrain)

The Bahrain Handball Federation (BHF) (Arabic: اتحاد البحرين لكرة اليد) is the governing body of handball and beach handball in the Kingdom of Bahrain. Founded in 1974, BHF is affiliated to the International Handball Federation and the Asian Handball Federation. BHF is also affiliated to the Bahrain Olympic Committee. It is based in Manama.

== BHF Presidents ==
S. No.	Name	Term
1.	Mohammed Ali Abul	1974–1980
2.	Fawaz Al-Zayani	1980–1984
3.	Sheikh Daij bin Hamad Al-Khalifa	1984–2002
4.	Sheikh Hisham bin Abdulrahman Al-Khalifa	2002–2004
5.	Abdul Rahman Bu Ali	2004–2008
6.	Ali Mohamed Isa Eshaqi	2008 – Till date

== Competitions hosted ==
=== International ===
- 2007 Men's Youth World Handball Championship

=== Continental ===
- 2016 Asian Men's Youth Handball Championship
- 2016 Asian Men's Handball Championship
- 2014 Asian Men's Handball Championship
- 2012 Asian Men's Youth Handball Championship
- 1998 Asian Men's Junior Handball Championship
- 1993 Asian Men's Handball Championship

=== Handball ===
==== National teams ====
- Bahrain

==== Club teams ====
===== Asia =====
- (Bahrain) Al-Najma SC
