= Fatima Abbas =

Bahraini engineer and politician (born 1973)

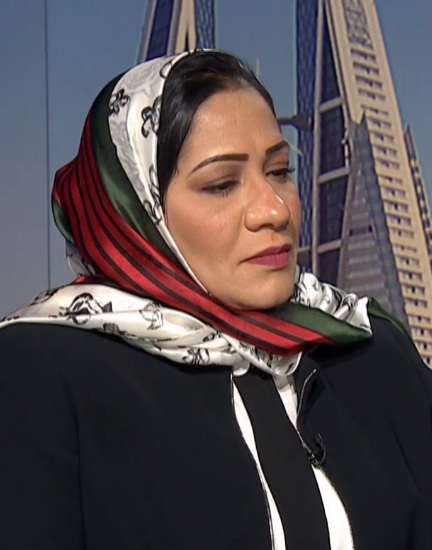
Fatima Abbas in 2019

Fatima Abbas Qasim Mohamed (Arabic: فاطمة عباس قاسم محمد; born 1973) is a Bahraini engineer and politician, member of the Council of Representatives between 2018 and 2022.

== Career ==
Abbas was born in 1973.

In 2001, she obtained a diploma in civil engineering from the University of Bahrain and graduated in information systems management from IMI International Management Institute Switzerland in 2009.

Between 2014 and 2018, Abbas was a member of the Manama Municipal Council and worked in the office of the Minister of Municipalities and Urbanism.

She was elected as a member of the Council of Representatives in the 2018 Bahraini general election representing the Northern Second Constituency. During her term as a deputy, which lasted throughout the legislative term until 2022, she was a member of the standing committee specializing in women and children, which she chaired between 2018 and 2020, and the committee on public services and the environment, of which she was vice-chair between 2018 and 2019. She was also vice-chair of the committee for the preparation of the draft response to the royal speech to the House of Representatives between 2020 and 2021.
