= Syrian Arab Handball Federation =

Governing body of handball in Syria

Syrian Arab Handball Federation SAHF
- IOC nation: Syria (SYR)
- Sport: Handball

HISTORY
- Year of formation: 1961; 64 years ago

AFFILIATIONS
- International federation: International Handball Federation (IHF)
- IHF member since: 1962
- Continental association: Asian Handball Federation
- National Olympic Committee: Syrian Olympic Committee
- Other affiliation(s): West Asian Handball Federation; Arab Handball Association

GOVERNING BODY
- President: Mohamad Ali Ghazi

HEADQUARTERS
- Address: Al-Fayhaa Sports Complex, Damascus
- Country: Syria
- Secretary General: Bashar Riad Radwan

FINANCE
- Sponsors: Cham Wings Airlines

The Syrian Arab Handball Federation (SAHF) is the administrative and controlling body for handball in Syria. SAHF is a member of the Asian Handball Federation (AHF) and member of the International Handball Federation (IHF) since 1962.

== National teams ==
- Syria men's national handball team
- Syria men's national junior handball team
- Syria men's national youth handball team
- Syria women's national handball team

== Competitions hosted ==
- 1994 Asian Men's Junior Handball Championship
- 1988 Asian Men's Junior Handball Championship
