= 2008 Asian Men's Youth Handball Championship =

2008 handball championship in Asia

2008 Asian Youth Championship

Tournament details
- Host country: Jordan
- Venue(s): 1 (in 1 host city)
- Dates: 11–21 July 2008
- Teams: 11

Final positions
- Champions: Kuwait (1st title)
- Runner-up: Qatar
- Third place: Iran
- Fourth place: Bahrain

Tournament statistics
- Matches played: 32
- Goals scored: 1,966 (61.44 per match)

The 2008 Asian Men's Youth Handball Championship (3rd tournament) took place in Amman from 11 July–21 July. It acts as the Asian qualifying tournament for the 2009 Men's Youth World Handball Championship in Tunisia.

== Draw ==
Group A	Group B
Qatar; South Korea; Iraq; India; Kuwait; Chinese Taipei	Iran; Jordan; Japan; Bahrain; Saudi Arabia

== Preliminary round ==
=== Group A ===
Team	Pld	W	D	L	GF	GA	GD	Pts
Kuwait	5	5	0	0	177	138	+39	10
Qatar	5	4	0	1	181	118	+63	8
South Korea	5	3	0	2	198	142	+56	6
Chinese Taipei	5	2	0	3	148	173	−25	4
Iraq	5	1	0	4	124	164	−40	2
India	5	0	0	5	129	222	−93	0

11 July 2008; 14:00	Qatar	45–25	India	Sports Palace Arena, Amman
11 July 2008; 14:00		(20–13)		Sports Palace Arena, Amman

11 July 2008; 17:00	Iraq	27–35	Kuwait	Sports Palace Arena, Amman
11 July 2008; 17:00		(10–18)		Sports Palace Arena, Amman

11 July 2008; 20:00	South Korea	44–30	Chinese Taipei	Sports Palace Arena, Amman
11 July 2008; 20:00		(18–17)		Sports Palace Arena, Amman

12 July 2008; 14:00	Chinese Taipei	30–24	Iraq	Sports Palace Arena, Amman
12 July 2008; 14:00		(13–14)		Sports Palace Arena, Amman

12 July 2008; 15:30	Kuwait	25–23	Qatar	Sports Palace Arena, Amman
12 July 2008; 15:30		(12–14)		Sports Palace Arena, Amman

12 July 2008; 17:00	South Korea	60–19	India	Sports Palace Arena, Amman
12 July 2008; 17:00		(29–12)		Sports Palace Arena, Amman

14 July 2008; 14:00	Qatar	38–18	Chinese Taipei	Sports Palace Arena, Amman
14 July 2008; 14:00		(22–6)		Sports Palace Arena, Amman

14 July 2008; 17:00	India	25–48	Kuwait	Sports Palace Arena, Amman
14 July 2008; 17:00		(13–24)		Sports Palace Arena, Amman

14 July 2008; 20:00	South Korea	33–22	Iraq	Sports Palace Arena, Amman
14 July 2008; 20:00		(20–9)		Sports Palace Arena, Amman

16 July 2008; 14:00	Iraq	19–36	Qatar	Sports Palace Arena, Amman
16 July 2008; 14:00		(11–20)		Sports Palace Arena, Amman

16 July 2008; 15:30	South Korea	30–32	Kuwait	Sports Palace Arena, Amman
16 July 2008; 15:30		(15–13)		Sports Palace Arena, Amman

16 July 2008; 17:00	Chinese Taipei	37–30	India	Sports Palace Arena, Amman
16 July 2008; 17:00		(15–13)		Sports Palace Arena, Amman

17 July 2008; 15:30	Qatar	39–31	South Korea	Sports Palace Arena, Amman
17 July 2008; 15:30		(19–15)		Sports Palace Arena, Amman

17 July 2008; 17:00	Kuwait	37–33	Chinese Taipei	Sports Palace Arena, Amman
17 July 2008; 17:00		(19–16)		Sports Palace Arena, Amman

17 July 2008; 20:00	Iraq	32–30	India	Sports Palace Arena, Amman
17 July 2008; 20:00		(16–17)		Sports Palace Arena, Amman

=== Group B ===
Team	Pld	W	D	L	GF	GA	GD	Pts
Iran	4	4	0	0	135	113	+22	8
Bahrain	4	3	0	1	121	120	+1	6
Saudi Arabia	4	2	0	2	118	124	−6	4
Japan	4	1	0	3	119	122	−3	2
Jordan	4	0	0	4	91	105	−14	0

11 July 2008; 15:30	Iran	35–31	Bahrain	Sports Palace Arena, Amman
11 July 2008; 15:30		(14–15)		Sports Palace Arena, Amman

11 July 2008; 18:30	Japan	33–34	Saudi Arabia	Sports Palace Arena, Amman
11 July 2008; 18:30		(18–13)		Sports Palace Arena, Amman

12 July 2008; 18:30	Jordan	22–25	Saudi Arabia	Sports Palace Arena, Amman
12 July 2008; 18:30		(12–12)		Sports Palace Arena, Amman

14 July 2008; 15:30	Iran	34–28	Japan	Sports Palace Arena, Amman
14 July 2008; 15:30		(16–11)		Sports Palace Arena, Amman

14 July 2008; 18:30	Jordan	26–27	Bahrain	Sports Palace Arena, Amman
14 July 2008; 18:30		(13–12)		Sports Palace Arena, Amman

15 July 2008; 16:00	Iran	39–32	Saudi Arabia	Sports Palace Arena, Amman
15 July 2008; 16:00		(17–17)		Sports Palace Arena, Amman

15 July 2008; 17:30	Japan	32–33	Bahrain	Sports Palace Arena, Amman
15 July 2008; 17:30		(17–19)		Sports Palace Arena, Amman

16 July 2008; 18:30	Jordan	21–26	Japan	Sports Palace Arena, Amman
16 July 2008; 18:30		(12–15)		Sports Palace Arena, Amman

17 July 2008; 14:00	Bahrain	30–27	Saudi Arabia	Sports Palace Arena, Amman
17 July 2008; 14:00		(13–13)		Sports Palace Arena, Amman

17 July 2008; 18:30	Iran	27–22	Jordan	Sports Palace Arena, Amman
17 July 2008; 18:30		(14–8)		Sports Palace Arena, Amman

== Placement 5th–10th ==
=== 9th/10th ===
20 July 2008; 16:00	Iraq	22–31	Jordan	Sports Palace Arena, Amman
20 July 2008; 16:00		(10–12)		Sports Palace Arena, Amman

=== 7th/8th ===
20 July 2008; 17:30	Chinese Taipei	30–31	Japan	Sports Palace Arena, Amman
20 July 2008; 17:30		(12–17)		Sports Palace Arena, Amman

=== 5th/6th ===
20 July 2008; 19:00	South Korea	44–37	Saudi Arabia	Sports Palace Arena, Amman
20 July 2008; 19:00		(26–16)		Sports Palace Arena, Amman

== Final round ==
Semifinals
19 July – Amman
Kuwait	33
Bahrain	29
19 July – Amman
Iran	27
Qatar	28

Gold medal match
21 July – Amman
Kuwait	31
Qatar	26
Bronze medal match
21 July – Amman
Bahrain	25
Iran	31

=== Semifinals ===
19 July 2008; 16:00	Kuwait	33–29	Bahrain	Sports Palace Arena, Amman
19 July 2008; 16:00		(16–13)		Sports Palace Arena, Amman

19 July 2008; 17:30	Iran	27–28	Qatar	Sports Palace Arena, Amman
19 July 2008; 17:30		(14–16)		Sports Palace Arena, Amman

=== Bronze medal match ===
21 July 2008; 16:00	Iran	31–25	Bahrain	Sports Palace Arena, Amman
21 July 2008; 16:00		(16–12)		Sports Palace Arena, Amman

=== Gold medal match ===
21 July 2008; 17:30	Kuwait	31–26	Qatar	Sports Palace Arena, Amman
21 July 2008; 17:30		(16–10)		Sports Palace Arena, Amman

== Final standing ==
Rank	Team
1st place, gold medalist(s)	Kuwait
2nd place, silver medalist(s)	Qatar
3rd place, bronze medalist(s)	Iran
4	Bahrain
5	South Korea
6	Saudi Arabia
7	Japan
8	Chinese Taipei
9	Jordan
10	Iraq
11	India

Team qualified for the 2009 Youth World Championship
