= 2010 Asian Men's Youth Handball Championship =

2010 handball championship in Asia

2010 Asian Youth Championship

Tournament details
- Host country: United Arab Emirates
- Venue: 1 (in 1 host city)
- Dates: 3–15 July 2010
- Teams: 11

Final positions
- Champions: Qatar (1st title)
- Runners-up: South Korea
- Third place: Bahrain
- Fourth place: Saudi Arabia

Tournament statistics
- Matches played: 32
- Goals scored: 1,751 (54.72 per match)

The 2010 Asian Men's Youth Handball Championship (4th tournament) took place in Abu Dhabi from 3 July–15 July. It acts as the Asian qualifying tournament for the 2011 Men's Youth World Handball Championship in Argentina.

== Draw ==
| Group A | Group B |
|---|---|
| Qatar; Iran; South Korea; Japan; Iraq; Lebanon | ~~Kuwait~~ * United Arab Emirates; Saudi Arabia; Chinese Taipei; Kazakhstan; Bahrain |

* Following the IOC decision to suspend the NOC of Kuwait which came in force on 1 January 2010, the International Handball Federation decided to suspend handball in Kuwait in all categories.

== Preliminary round ==
=== Group A ===
| Team | Pld | W | D | L | GF | GA | GD | Pts |
|---|---|---|---|---|---|---|---|---|
| Qatar | 5 | 5 | 0 | 0 | 171 | 116 | +55 | 10 |
| South Korea | 5 | 3 | 1 | 1 | 172 | 121 | +51 | 7 |
| Iran | 5 | 3 | 0 | 2 | 160 | 153 | +7 | 6 |
| Japan | 5 | 2 | 1 | 2 | 157 | 128 | +29 | 5 |
| Iraq | 5 | 1 | 0 | 4 | 101 | 151 | −50 | 2 |
| Lebanon | 5 | 0 | 0 | 5 | 84 | 176 | −92 | 0 |

| 4 July 2010; 16:00 | Iran | 36–14 | Lebanon | Al-Jazira Club Court, Abu Dhabi |
| 4 July 2010; 16:00 | | (19–7) | | Al-Jazira Club Court, Abu Dhabi |

| 4 July 2010; 18:00 | South Korea | 41–16 | Iraq | Al-Jazira Club Court, Abu Dhabi |
| 4 July 2010; 18:00 | | (19–7) | | Al-Jazira Club Court, Abu Dhabi |

| 4 July 2010; 20:00 | Qatar | 34–24 | Japan | Al-Jazira Club Court, Abu Dhabi |
| 4 July 2010; 20:00 | | (18–11) | | Al-Jazira Club Court, Abu Dhabi |

| 6 July 2010; 16:00 | Iraq | 21–26 | Qatar | Al-Jazira Club Court, Abu Dhabi |
| 6 July 2010; 16:00 | | (11–10) | | Al-Jazira Club Court, Abu Dhabi |

| 6 July 2010; 18:00 | Lebanon | 19–38 | South Korea | Al-Jazira Club Court, Abu Dhabi |
| 6 July 2010; 18:00 | | (9–20) | | Al-Jazira Club Court, Abu Dhabi |

| 6 July 2010; 20:00 | Japan | 33–34 | Iran | Al-Jazira Club Court, Abu Dhabi |
| 6 July 2010; 20:00 | | (20–16) | | Al-Jazira Club Court, Abu Dhabi |

| 8 July 2010; 16:00 | Iran | 30–41 | South Korea | Al-Jazira Club Court, Abu Dhabi |
| 8 July 2010; 16:00 | | (13–20) | | Al-Jazira Club Court, Abu Dhabi |

| 8 July 2010; 18:00 | Japan | 34–18 | Iraq | Al-Jazira Club Court, Abu Dhabi |
| 8 July 2010; 18:00 | | (15–10) | | Al-Jazira Club Court, Abu Dhabi |

| 8 July 2010; 20:00 | Qatar | 41–21 | Lebanon | Al-Jazira Club Court, Abu Dhabi |
| 8 July 2010; 20:00 | | (20–8) | | Al-Jazira Club Court, Abu Dhabi |

| 10 July 2010; 16:00 | South Korea | 22–26 | Qatar | Al-Jazira Club Court, Abu Dhabi |
| 10 July 2010; 16:00 | | (12–12) | | Al-Jazira Club Court, Abu Dhabi |

| 10 July 2010; 18:00 | Lebanon | 12–36 | Japan | Al-Jazira Club Court, Abu Dhabi |
| 10 July 2010; 18:00 | | (8–18) | | Al-Jazira Club Court, Abu Dhabi |

| 10 July 2010; 20:00 | Iran | 32–21 | Iraq | Al-Jazira Club Court, Abu Dhabi |
| 10 July 2010; 20:00 | | (17–10) | | Al-Jazira Club Court, Abu Dhabi |

| 12 July 2010; 16:00 | Iraq | 25–18 | Lebanon | Al-Jazira Club Court, Abu Dhabi |
| 12 July 2010; 16:00 | | (11–10) | | Al-Jazira Club Court, Abu Dhabi |

| 12 July 2010; 18:00 | Qatar | 44–28 | Iran | Al-Jazira Club Court, Abu Dhabi |
| 12 July 2010; 18:00 | | (23–16) | | Al-Jazira Club Court, Abu Dhabi |

| 12 July 2010; 20:00 | South Korea | 30–30 | Japan | Al-Jazira Club Court, Abu Dhabi |
| 12 July 2010; 20:00 | | (15–12) | | Al-Jazira Club Court, Abu Dhabi |

=== Group B ===
| Team | Pld | W | D | L | GF | GA | GD | Pts |
|---|---|---|---|---|---|---|---|---|
| Bahrain | 4 | 4 | 0 | 0 | 149 | 95 | +54 | 8 |
| Saudi Arabia | 4 | 2 | 1 | 1 | 128 | 91 | +37 | 5 |
| United Arab Emirates | 4 | 2 | 1 | 1 | 85 | 88 | −3 | 5 |
| Chinese Taipei | 4 | 1 | 0 | 3 | 99 | 112 | −13 | 2 |
| Kazakhstan | 4 | 0 | 0 | 4 | 50 | 125 | −75 | 0 |

| 3 July 2010; 18:00 | United Arab Emirates | 10–0 | Kazakhstan | Al-Jazira Club Court, Abu Dhabi |
| 3 July 2010; 18:00 | | (Walkover) | | Al-Jazira Club Court, Abu Dhabi |

| 3 July 2010; 20:00 | Saudi Arabia | 34–19 | Chinese Taipei | Al-Jazira Club Court, Abu Dhabi |
| 3 July 2010; 20:00 | | (15–9) | | Al-Jazira Club Court, Abu Dhabi |

| 5 July 2010; 17:00 | Bahrain | 33–30 | Saudi Arabia | Al-Jazira Club Court, Abu Dhabi |
| 5 July 2010; 17:00 | | (19–15) | | Al-Jazira Club Court, Abu Dhabi |

| 5 July 2010; 19:00 | United Arab Emirates | 25–24 | Chinese Taipei | Al-Jazira Club Court, Abu Dhabi |
| 5 July 2010; 19:00 | | (12–8) | | Al-Jazira Club Court, Abu Dhabi |

| 7 July 2010; 17:00 | Bahrain | 35–22 | Chinese Taipei | Al-Jazira Club Court, Abu Dhabi |
| 7 July 2010; 17:00 | | (17–6) | | Al-Jazira Club Court, Abu Dhabi |

| 7 July 2010; 19:00 | Saudi Arabia | 40–15 | Kazakhstan | Al-Jazira Club Court, Abu Dhabi |
| 7 July 2010; 19:00 | | (19–6) | | Al-Jazira Club Court, Abu Dhabi |

| 9 July 2010; 17:00 | Bahrain | 41–17 | Kazakhstan | Al-Jazira Club Court, Abu Dhabi |
| 9 July 2010; 17:00 | | (23–7) | | Al-Jazira Club Court, Abu Dhabi |

| 9 July 2010; 19:00 | United Arab Emirates | 24–24 | Saudi Arabia | Al-Jazira Club Court, Abu Dhabi |
| 9 July 2010; 19:00 | | (14–11) | | Al-Jazira Club Court, Abu Dhabi |

| 11 July 2010; 17:00 | Chinese Taipei | 34–18 | Kazakhstan | Al-Jazira Club Court, Abu Dhabi |

| 11 July 2010; 19:00 | Bahrain | 40–26 | United Arab Emirates | Al-Jazira Club Court, Abu Dhabi |
| 11 July 2010; 19:00 | | (18–8) | | Al-Jazira Club Court, Abu Dhabi |

== Placement 5th–10th ==
=== 9th/10th ===
| 14 July 2010; 12:00 | Iraq | 10–0 | Kazakhstan | Al-Jazira Club Court, Abu Dhabi |
| 14 July 2010; 12:00 | | (Walkover) | | Al-Jazira Club Court, Abu Dhabi |

=== 7th/8th ===
| 14 July 2010; 14:00 | Japan | 31–27 | Chinese Taipei | Al-Jazira Club Court, Abu Dhabi |
| 14 July 2010; 14:00 | | (16–15) | | Al-Jazira Club Court, Abu Dhabi |

=== 5th/6th ===
| 14 July 2010; 16:00 | Iran | 40–36 | United Arab Emirates | Al-Jazira Club Court, Abu Dhabi |
| 14 July 2010; 16:00 | | (17–17) | | Al-Jazira Club Court, Abu Dhabi |

== Final round ==
Semifinals
14 July – Abu Dhabi
Qatar | 26
Saudi Arabia | 19
14 July – Abu Dhabi
Bahrain | 35
South Korea | 36

Gold medal match
15 July – Abu Dhabi
Qatar | 37
South Korea | 30
Bronze medal match
15 July – Abu Dhabi
Saudi Arabia | 35 (2)
Bahrain (p) | 35 (4)

=== Semifinals ===
| 14 July 2010; 18:00 | Qatar | 26–19 | Saudi Arabia | Al-Jazira Club Court, Abu Dhabi |
| 14 July 2010; 18:00 | | (12–13) | | Al-Jazira Club Court, Abu Dhabi |

| 14 July 2010; 20:00 | Bahrain | 35–36 | South Korea | Al-Jazira Club Court, Abu Dhabi |
| 14 July 2010; 20:00 | | (20–19) | | Al-Jazira Club Court, Abu Dhabi |

=== Bronze medal match ===
15 July 2010
17:00
Saudi Arabia
35–35 (ET)
Bahrain
Al-Jazira Club Court, Abu Dhabi

(13–17)

FT: 27–27 ET: 5–5, 3–3 Pen: 2–4

=== Gold medal match ===
| 15 July 2010; 19:00 | Qatar | 37–30 | South Korea | Al-Jazira Club Court, Abu Dhabi |
| 15 July 2010; 19:00 | | (20–16) | | Al-Jazira Club Court, Abu Dhabi |

== Final standing ==
| Rank | Team |
|---|---|
| 1st place, gold medalist(s) | Qatar |
| 2nd place, silver medalist(s) | South Korea |
| 3rd place, bronze medalist(s) | Bahrain |
| 4 | Saudi Arabia |
| 5 | Iran |
| 6 | United Arab Emirates |
| 7 | Japan |
| 8 | Chinese Taipei |
| 9 | Iraq |
| 10 | Kazakhstan |
| 11 | Lebanon |

| Team qualified for the 2011 Youth World Championship |
