= 2020 Asian Men's Youth Handball Championship =

2020 handball championship in Asia

9th Asian Men's Youth (U-19) Handball Championship 2020
Tournament details
- Host country: Kazakhstan
- Venue(s): 1 (in 1 host city)
- Dates: Cancelled
- Teams: 12 (from 1 confederation)

The 2020 Asian Men's Youth Handball Championship would have been the 9th edition of the Asian Men's Youth Handball Championship, a biannual championship in handball organised by the Asian Handball Federation (AHF).

It was originally scheduled to take place from 15 to 26 August 2020, but was postponed due to the COVID-19 pandemic.

On 22 February 2021, the AHF cancelled the tournament because of the pandemic.

== Teams ==
Following 12 teams intended to participate in the championship.

- Bahrain
- Chinese Taipei
- India
- Iran
- Iraq
- Kazakhstan
- Kuwait
- Qatar
- Saudi Arabia
- South Korea
- United Arab Emirates
- Uzbekistan
