= Mohammed Isa Al Abbasi =

Bahraini politician and journalist

- محمد عيسى العباسي

Member of the Council of Representatives (Bahrain), 3rd District, Muharraq Governorate
- Incumbent
- Assumed office 2018
- Monarch: Hamad bin Isa Al Khalifa
- Prime Minister: Khalifa bin Salman Al Khalifa
- Preceded by: Jamal Bou Hassan
- Parliamentary group: Independent

Personal details
- Born: Mohammed Issa Ahmed Abdullah Al-Abbasi
- Occupation: journalist

Mohammed Isa Al Abbasi (Arabic: محمد عيسى العباسي) is a Bahraini politician and journalist. He was sworn into the Council of Representatives on December 12, 2018.

== Education ==
Al Abassi graduated from Ahlia University.

== 2011 protests ==
During the Bahraini uprising of 2011, as a broadcaster on the TV channel of the Bahrain Radio and Television Corporation, Al Abassi took a firmly royalist stance which led to heavy opposition criticism. In 2013, he was suspended in a climate of increased rapprochement between the opposition and the House of Khalifa.

== House of Representatives ==
Al Abassi entered politics by running in the 2018 Bahraini general election for the third constituency of the Muharraq Governorate in the national House of Representatives. He won 2,217 votes for 38.54% in the first round on November 24, necessitating a second round on December 1, in which he defeated Mohammed Al Alawi with 3,096 votes for 58.64%.
