= 2022 Asian Men's Youth Handball Championship =

2022 handball championship in Asia

Tournament details
- Host country: Bahrain
- Venue(s): 1 (in 1 host city)
- Dates: 20–31 August
- Teams: 11 (from 1 confederation)

Final positions
- Champions: South Korea (3rd title)
- Runners-up: Iran
- Third place: Saudi Arabia
- Fourth place: Japan

Tournament statistics
- Matches played: 34
- Goals scored: 1,959 (57.62 per match)

The 2022 Asian Men's Youth Handball Championship was the 9th edition of the Asian Men's Youth Handball Championship, a biannual championship in handball organized by the Asian Handball Federation (AHF).

The 9th edition of this tournament was originally scheduled to take place from 15 to 26 August 2020, but was postponed due to the COVID-19 pandemic, and then finally cancelled.

The venue is Khalifa Sports City Stadium, Isa Town.

The top five teams qualified for the 2023 Men's Youth World Handball Championship in Croatia.

== Teams ==
Following 11 teams intended to participate in the championship.

- Bahrain
- India
- Iran
- Iraq
- Japan
- Kuwait
- Qatar
- Saudi Arabia
- South Korea
- United Arab Emirates
- Uzbekistan

== Draw ==
The draw was held on Wednesday, 8 June 2022 at 19:30 at the Millennium Hotel and Convention Centre, Salmiya, Kuwait.

== Preliminary round ==
All times are local (UTC+3).

=== Group A ===
Pos	Team	Pld	W	D	L	GF	GA	GD	Pts	Qualification
1	South Korea	4	4	0	0	162	90	+72	8	Semifinals
2	Iran	4	3	0	1	153	95	+58	6	Semifinals
3	Bahrain (H)	4	2	0	2	122	116	+6	4	5–8th place semifinals
4	Uzbekistan	4	1	0	3	106	127	−21	2	5–8th place semifinals
5	India	4	0	0	4	88	203	−115	0	Ninth place game

Source: AHF
Rules for classification: 1) Points; 2) Head-to-head points; 3) Head-to-head goal difference; 4) Head-to-head goals scored; 5) Goal difference; 6) Goals scored; 7) Draw.
(H) Hosts

20 August 2022; 11:00	South Korea	29–24	Iran	Khalifa Sports City Stadium, Isa Town; Referees: Ismoilov, Ismoilov (UZB)
20 August 2022; 11:00	Choi, Son 7	(12–11)	Haidarian 12	Khalifa Sports City Stadium, Isa Town; Referees: Ismoilov, Ismoilov (UZB)
20 August 2022; 11:00	3× (suspension)	Report	1× (yellow card) 8× (suspension)	Khalifa Sports City Stadium, Isa Town; Referees: Ismoilov, Ismoilov (UZB)

20 August 2022; 19:00	Uzbekistan	21–28	Bahrain	Khalifa Sports City Stadium, Isa Town; Referees: Al-Shaib, Al-Naemi (QAT)
20 August 2022; 19:00	three players 4	(12–17)	Abdulla 10	Khalifa Sports City Stadium, Isa Town; Referees: Al-Shaib, Al-Naemi (QAT)
20 August 2022; 19:00	2× (yellow card) 4× (suspension)	Report	8× (suspension)	Khalifa Sports City Stadium, Isa Town; Referees: Al-Shaib, Al-Naemi (QAT)

21 August 2022; 13:00	India	14–64	Iran	Khalifa Sports City Stadium, Isa Town
21 August 2022; 13:00	Yash 5	(4–31)	Masoudnia 11	Khalifa Sports City Stadium, Isa Town
21 August 2022; 13:00	5× (suspension)	Report	1× (suspension)	Khalifa Sports City Stadium, Isa Town

21 August 2022; 19:00	South Korea	39–22	Bahrain	Khalifa Sports City Stadium, Isa Town
21 August 2022; 19:00	three players 7	(17–16)	Farsan 6	Khalifa Sports City Stadium, Isa Town
21 August 2022; 19:00	2× (yellow card) 2× (suspension) 1× (red card)	Report	1× (yellow card) 3× (suspension) 1× (red card)	Khalifa Sports City Stadium, Isa Town

23 August 2022; 11:00	South Korea	55–23	India	Khalifa Sports City Stadium, Isa Town; Referees: Mozafarivanani, Mazaheri (IRI)
23 August 2022; 11:00	Lee 14	(24–10)	Yash 11	Khalifa Sports City Stadium, Isa Town; Referees: Mozafarivanani, Mazaheri (IRI)
23 August 2022; 11:00	3× (suspension)	Report	3× (suspension)	Khalifa Sports City Stadium, Isa Town; Referees: Mozafarivanani, Mazaheri (IRI)

23 August 2022; 17:00	Iran	35–23	Uzbekistan	Khalifa Sports City Stadium, Isa Town; Referees: Al-Sugufi, Al-Sager (KSA)
23 August 2022; 17:00	Karami 10	(21–13)	Joldasbaev 10	Khalifa Sports City Stadium, Isa Town; Referees: Al-Sugufi, Al-Sager (KSA)
23 August 2022; 17:00	7× (suspension)	Report	7× (suspension)	Khalifa Sports City Stadium, Isa Town; Referees: Al-Sugufi, Al-Sager (KSA)

24 August 2022; 13:00	Uzbekistan	21–39	South Korea	Khalifa Sports City Stadium, Isa Town; Referees: Al-Wahibi, Al-Shahi (OMN)
24 August 2022; 13:00	Baratov 7	(15–17)	Lee 9	Khalifa Sports City Stadium, Isa Town; Referees: Al-Wahibi, Al-Shahi (OMN)
24 August 2022; 13:00	8× (suspension)	Report	1× (suspension)	Khalifa Sports City Stadium, Isa Town; Referees: Al-Wahibi, Al-Shahi (OMN)

24 August 2022; 19:00	India	26–43	Bahrain	Khalifa Sports City Stadium, Isa Town; Referees: Al-Sugufi, Al-Sager (KSA)
24 August 2022; 19:00	Yash 10	(14–24)	Almuhafdha 9	Khalifa Sports City Stadium, Isa Town; Referees: Al-Sugufi, Al-Sager (KSA)
24 August 2022; 19:00	5× (suspension)	Report	2× (suspension)	Khalifa Sports City Stadium, Isa Town; Referees: Al-Sugufi, Al-Sager (KSA)

26 August 2022; 13:00	Uzbekistan	41–25	India	Khalifa Sports City Stadium, Isa Town; Referees: Al-Shaib, Al-Naemi (QAT)
26 August 2022; 13:00	Yakubov 8	(16–13)	Vipul 9	Khalifa Sports City Stadium, Isa Town; Referees: Al-Shaib, Al-Naemi (QAT)
26 August 2022; 13:00	4× (suspension)	Report	4× (suspension)	Khalifa Sports City Stadium, Isa Town; Referees: Al-Shaib, Al-Naemi (QAT)

26 August 2022; 19:00	Bahrain	29– 30	Iran	Khalifa Sports City Stadium, Isa Town; Referees: Al-Zayyat, Awwad (JOR)
26 August 2022; 19:00	Farsan 8	(10–12)	Dareini 6	Khalifa Sports City Stadium, Isa Town; Referees: Al-Zayyat, Awwad (JOR)
26 August 2022; 19:00	2× (yellow card) 4× (suspension) 1× (red card)	Report	1× (yellow card) 8× (suspension) 1× (red card)	Khalifa Sports City Stadium, Isa Town; Referees: Al-Zayyat, Awwad (JOR)

=== Group B ===
Pos	Team	Pld	W	D	L	GF	GA	GD	Pts	Qualification
1	Saudi Arabia	5	5	0	0	173	132	+41	10	Semifinals
2	Japan	5	4	0	1	161	118	+43	8	Semifinals
3	Kuwait	5	3	0	2	164	118	+46	6	5–8th place semifinals
4	Qatar	5	2	0	3	126	140	−14	4	5–8th place semifinals
5	Iraq	5	1	0	4	110	165	−55	2	Ninth place game
6	United Arab Emirates	5	0	0	5	113	174	−61	0	

Source: AHF
Rules for classification: 1) Points; 2) Head-to-head points; 3) Head-to-head goal difference; 4) Head-to-head goals scored; 5) Goal difference; 6) Goals scored; 7) Draw.

20 August 2022; 13:00	Qatar	36–22	United Arab Emirates	Khalifa Sports City Stadium, Isa Town; Referees: Shamrookh, Jawad (BHR)
20 August 2022; 13:00	Karaoui 9	(17–11)	Abdelqadir 8	Khalifa Sports City Stadium, Isa Town; Referees: Shamrookh, Jawad (BHR)
20 August 2022; 13:00	1× (suspension)	Report	3× (suspension)	Khalifa Sports City Stadium, Isa Town; Referees: Shamrookh, Jawad (BHR)

20 August 2022; 15:00	Saudi Arabia	44–22	Iraq	Khalifa Sports City Stadium, Isa Town; Referees: Aljayyat, Awwad (JOR)
20 August 2022; 15:00	Alsaeed, Furaij 7	(23–9)	Kadhim 8	Khalifa Sports City Stadium, Isa Town; Referees: Aljayyat, Awwad (JOR)
20 August 2022; 15:00	1× (yellow card) 10× (suspension)	Report	4× (suspension) 1× (red card)	Khalifa Sports City Stadium, Isa Town; Referees: Aljayyat, Awwad (JOR)

20 August 2022; 17:00	Japan	31–26	Kuwait	Khalifa Sports City Stadium, Isa Town; Referees: Al-Wahibi, Al-Shahi (OMA)
20 August 2022; 17:00	Hori 10	(14–14)	three players 4	Khalifa Sports City Stadium, Isa Town; Referees: Al-Wahibi, Al-Shahi (OMA)
20 August 2022; 17:00	1× (yellow card) 3× (suspension)	Report	3× (suspension)	Khalifa Sports City Stadium, Isa Town; Referees: Al-Wahibi, Al-Shahi (OMA)

21 August 2022; 11:00	Saudi Arabia	27–24	Qatar	Khalifa Sports City Stadium, Isa Town; Referees: Al-Wahibi, Al-Wahibi (OMN)
21 August 2022; 11:00	Furaij 8	(14–12)	Mousa 9	Khalifa Sports City Stadium, Isa Town; Referees: Al-Wahibi, Al-Wahibi (OMN)
21 August 2022; 11:00	4× (suspension)	Report	1× (yellow card) 3× (suspension)	Khalifa Sports City Stadium, Isa Town; Referees: Al-Wahibi, Al-Wahibi (OMN)

21 August 2022; 15:00	Iraq	22–36	Japan	Khalifa Sports City Stadium, Isa Town; Referees: Mozafarivanani, Mazaheri (IRI)
21 August 2022; 15:00	Almaliki 6	(11–17)	Hori 7	Khalifa Sports City Stadium, Isa Town; Referees: Mozafarivanani, Mazaheri (IRI)
21 August 2022; 15:00	2× (suspension)	Report	1× (suspension)	Khalifa Sports City Stadium, Isa Town; Referees: Mozafarivanani, Mazaheri (IRI)

21 August 2022; 17:00	United Arab Emirates	23–37	Kuwait	Khalifa Sports City Stadium, Isa Town; Referees: Al-Sugufi, Al-Sager (KSA)
21 August 2022; 17:00	Al Ali 7	(12–20)	N. Abdulaziz, Abdullatif 7	Khalifa Sports City Stadium, Isa Town; Referees: Al-Sugufi, Al-Sager (KSA)
21 August 2022; 17:00	3× (suspension)	Report	5× (suspension)	Khalifa Sports City Stadium, Isa Town; Referees: Al-Sugufi, Al-Sager (KSA)

23 August 2022; 13:00	Kuwait	31–34	Saudi Arabia	Khalifa Sports City Stadium, Isa Town; Referees: Al-Zayyat, Awwad (JOR)
23 August 2022; 13:00	N. Abdulaziz 5	(16–15)	Alsaeed 8	Khalifa Sports City Stadium, Isa Town; Referees: Al-Zayyat, Awwad (JOR)
23 August 2022; 13:00	1× (yellow card) 7× (suspension)	Report	2× (yellow card) 11× (suspension)	Khalifa Sports City Stadium, Isa Town; Referees: Al-Zayyat, Awwad (JOR)

23 August 2022; 15:00	Qatar	27–25	Iraq	Khalifa Sports City Stadium, Isa Town; Referees: Al-Shamrookh, Jawad (BHR)
23 August 2022; 15:00	Raza 7	(14–11)	Ali 13	Khalifa Sports City Stadium, Isa Town; Referees: Al-Shamrookh, Jawad (BHR)
23 August 2022; 15:00	1× (yellow card) 4× (suspension)	Report	1× (suspension)	Khalifa Sports City Stadium, Isa Town; Referees: Al-Shamrookh, Jawad (BHR)

23 August 2022; 19:00	Japan	35–18	United Arab Emirates	Khalifa Sports City Stadium, Isa Town; Referees: Noochan, Suansiri (THA)
23 August 2022; 19:00	Matsuoka, Tachibana 5	(21–10)	Alblooshi 5	Khalifa Sports City Stadium, Isa Town; Referees: Noochan, Suansiri (THA)
23 August 2022; 19:00	2× (suspension)	Report	3× (suspension)	Khalifa Sports City Stadium, Isa Town; Referees: Noochan, Suansiri (THA)

24 August 2022; 11:00	Iraq	12–35	Kuwait	Khalifa Sports City Stadium, Isa Town; Referees: Ismoilov, Ismoilov (UZB)
24 August 2022; 11:00	three players 3	(4–14)	Abdulaziz 9	Khalifa Sports City Stadium, Isa Town; Referees: Ismoilov, Ismoilov (UZB)
24 August 2022; 11:00	1× (yellow card) 2× (suspension)	Report	3× (suspension)	Khalifa Sports City Stadium, Isa Town; Referees: Ismoilov, Ismoilov (UZB)

24 August 2022; 15:00	Qatar	21–31	Japan	Khalifa Sports City Stadium, Isa Town; Referees: Al-Naseem, Al-Enezi (KUW)
24 August 2022; 15:00	Mousa 6	(11–14)	Furukawa, Tachibana 5	Khalifa Sports City Stadium, Isa Town; Referees: Al-Naseem, Al-Enezi (KUW)
24 August 2022; 15:00	1× (yellow card) 3× (suspension) 1× (red card)	Report	1× (yellow card) 2× (suspension)	Khalifa Sports City Stadium, Isa Town; Referees: Al-Naseem, Al-Enezi (KUW)

24 August 2022; 17:00	United Arab Emirates	27–37	Saudi Arabia	Khalifa Sports City Stadium, Isa Town; Referees: Al-Shamrookh, Jawad (BHR)
24 August 2022; 17:00	Al Ali	(13–20)	Alsaeed 9	Khalifa Sports City Stadium, Isa Town; Referees: Al-Shamrookh, Jawad (BHR)
24 August 2022; 17:00	4× (suspension)	Report	2× (suspension)	Khalifa Sports City Stadium, Isa Town; Referees: Al-Shamrookh, Jawad (BHR)

26 August 2022; 11:00	United Arab Emirates	23–29	Iraq	Khalifa Sports City Stadium, Isa Town; Referees: Al-Naseem, Al-Enezi (KUW)
26 August 2022; 11:00	Abdelqadir 8	(14–13)	Ali 7	Khalifa Sports City Stadium, Isa Town; Referees: Al-Naseem, Al-Enezi (KUW)
26 August 2022; 11:00	3× (suspension)	Report	2× (suspension)	Khalifa Sports City Stadium, Isa Town; Referees: Al-Naseem, Al-Enezi (KUW)

26 August 2022; 15:00	Japan	28–31	Saudi Arabia	Khalifa Sports City Stadium, Isa Town; Referees: Ismoilov, Ismoilov (UZB)
26 August 2022; 15:00	Furukawa 7	(14–17)	Alsaeed 9	Khalifa Sports City Stadium, Isa Town; Referees: Ismoilov, Ismoilov (UZB)
26 August 2022; 15:00	2× (suspension)	Report	1× (yellow card) 3× (suspension)	Khalifa Sports City Stadium, Isa Town; Referees: Ismoilov, Ismoilov (UZB)

26 August 2022; 17:00	Kuwait	35–18	Qatar	Khalifa Sports City Stadium, Isa Town; Referees: Al Wahibi, Al-Shahi (OMN)
26 August 2022; 17:00	Husain 7	(19–12)	Mousa 5	Khalifa Sports City Stadium, Isa Town; Referees: Al Wahibi, Al-Shahi (OMN)
26 August 2022; 17:00	3× (suspension)	Report	5× (suspension)	Khalifa Sports City Stadium, Isa Town; Referees: Al Wahibi, Al-Shahi (OMN)

== Final round ==
=== Bracket ===
Semifinals
28 August
South Korea	23
Japan	21
28 August
Saudi Arabia	32
Iran (ET)	33

Final
31 August
South Korea	26
Iran	22
Third place
31 August
Japan	25
Saudi Arabia	26

5–8th place semifinals
28 August
Bahrain	37
Qatar	26
28 August
Kuwait	22
Uzbekistan	20

Fifth place
30 August
Bahrain	27
Kuwait	21
Seventh place
30 August
Qatar (pen)	29
Uzbekistan	28

=== 5–8th place semifinals ===
28 August 2022; 13:00	Bahrain	37–26	Qatar	Khalifa Sports City Stadium, Isa Town
28 August 2022; 13:00		(19–13)		Khalifa Sports City Stadium, Isa Town
28 August 2022; 13:00		Report		Khalifa Sports City Stadium, Isa Town

28 August 2022; 15:00	Kuwait	22–20	Uzbekistan	Khalifa Sports City Stadium, Isa Town
28 August 2022; 15:00		(7–11)		Khalifa Sports City Stadium, Isa Town
28 August 2022; 15:00		Report		Khalifa Sports City Stadium, Isa Town

=== Semifinals ===
28 August 2022; 17:00	South Korea	23–21	Japan	Khalifa Sports City Stadium, Isa Town
28 August 2022; 17:00		(11–9)		Khalifa Sports City Stadium, Isa Town
28 August 2022; 17:00		Report		Khalifa Sports City Stadium, Isa Town

28 August 2022
19:00
Saudi Arabia
32–33 (ET)
Iran
Khalifa Sports City Stadium, Isa Town

(15–14)

Report

FT: 24–24 ET: 4–4, 4–5

=== Ninth place game ===
28 August 2022; 11:00	India	26–37	Iraq	Khalifa Sports City Stadium, Isa Town
28 August 2022; 11:00		(12–17)		Khalifa Sports City Stadium, Isa Town
28 August 2022; 11:00		Report		Khalifa Sports City Stadium, Isa Town

=== Seventh place game ===
30 August 2022
16:00
Qatar
29–28
Uzbekistan
Khalifa Sports City Stadium, Isa Town

(13–11)

Report

FT: 26–26 Pen: 3–2

=== Fifth place game ===
30 August 2022; 18:00	Bahrain	27–21	Kuwait	Khalifa Sports City Stadium, Isa Town
30 August 2022; 18:00		(14–10)		Khalifa Sports City Stadium, Isa Town
30 August 2022; 18:00		Report		Khalifa Sports City Stadium, Isa Town

=== Third place game ===
31 August 2022; 16:00	Japan	25–26	Saudi Arabia	Khalifa Sports City Stadium, Isa Town
31 August 2022; 16:00		(13–12)		Khalifa Sports City Stadium, Isa Town
31 August 2022; 16:00		Report		Khalifa Sports City Stadium, Isa Town

=== Final ===
31 August 2022; 18:00	South Korea	26–22	Iran	Khalifa Sports City Stadium, Isa Town; Referees: Ismoilov, Ismoilov (UZB)
31 August 2022; 18:00	three players 5	(14–11)	Goli 6	Khalifa Sports City Stadium, Isa Town; Referees: Ismoilov, Ismoilov (UZB)
31 August 2022; 18:00	2× (suspension)	Report	4× (suspension)	Khalifa Sports City Stadium, Isa Town; Referees: Ismoilov, Ismoilov (UZB)

== Final standings ==
Rank	Team
1st place, gold medalist(s)	South Korea
2nd place, silver medalist(s)	Iran
3rd place, bronze medalist(s)	Saudi Arabia
4	Japan
5	Bahrain
6	Kuwait
7	Qatar
8	Uzbekistan
9	Iraq
10	India
11	United Arab Emirates

Team qualified for the 2023 Youth World Championship
