= 2018 Bahraini general election =

- 24 November 2018 (first round); 1 December 2018 (second round)
- All 40 seats in the Council of Representatives

General elections were held in Bahrain in November and December 2018 to elect the 40 members of the Council of Representatives. The first round of voting was on Saturday, 24 November, with a second round in 31 constituencies on Saturday, 1 December. A municipal poll coincided with the parliamentary vote.

The elections were considered to be a sham, as they followed a government crackdown on dissent that included prohibiting members of dissolved opposition groups from running. Following the 2011 Bahraini protests, all 18 Al Wefaq members on the Council resigned, and were barred from contesting the subsequent by-elections. Since 2011, authorities have imprisoned hundreds of dissidents, including Al Wefaq leader Sheikh Ali Salman, and stripped many of Bahraini citizenship. Al Wefaq boycotted the 2014 Bahraini general election.

The two main opposition groups, the Shiite Al-Wefaq and secular Waad, were barred from fielding candidates in 2018, prompting renewed calls for a boycott. A court banned Al Wefaq in 2016 for "harbouring terrorism", inciting violence and encouraging demonstrations which threatened to spark sectarian strife. On 17 July 2016, Saudi-owned Al Arabiya television and international print media reported that Bahrain's highest court dissolved Al Wefaq and liquidated the group's funds.

== Electoral system ==
The 40 members of the Council of Representatives were elected from single-member constituencies using a two-round system; if no candidate received a majority of the vote in the first round, a second round was held.

== Constituencies ==
Each governorate is divided into a number of constituencies for the election for the Council of Representatives. Each constituency is listed as area 1, area 2 etc. Each constituency elects one member. Only Bahraini nationals are entitled to stand for and to vote at elections.

Governorate	Population (2010)	Non-nationals (2010)	Nationals (2010)	Divisions (2018)
Capital Governorate	329,510	261,921	67,589	10
Muharraq Governorate	189,114	86,870	102,244	8
Northern Governorate	276,949	82,887	194,062	12
Southern Governorate	101,456	68,525	32,931	10
Other	11,237	11,237		
Total	1,234,571	666,172	568,399	40
Source: CIO

== Campaign ==
Candidates had to apply between 17 and 21 October 2018, with 293 registering to contest the 40 seats.

== Results ==
Nine of the 40 constituencies were decided in the first round, with the other 31 going to a runoff. According to the government, voter turnout in the first round was 67%, an increase from 53% in the 2014 elections. However, the opposition claimed that the real voter turnout did not exceed 28%-30%.

=== List of elected members ===
Constituency	Elected member
Capital First	Abel Abdulrahman Mohammed Ahmed Alasoomi
Capital Second	Sawsan Mohamed Abdulrahim Kamal
Capital Third	Mamdooh Abbas Ahmad Alsaleh
Capital Fourth	Ammar Ahmed Ghuloom Albannai
Capital Fifth	Ahmed Sabah Salman Alsalloom
Capital Sixth	Masooma Hasan Abdulhusain Abdulrahim
Capital Seventh	Zainab Abdulameer Khalil Ebrahim
Capital Eighth	Fadhel Abbas Ali Isa Alsawad
Capital Ninth	Ammar Husain Ebrahim Abbas
Capital Tenth	Ali Mohamed Isa Abdulla Ishaqi
Muharraq First	Hamad Ahmed Mohamed Saleh Alkooheji
Muharraq Second	Ebrahim Khalid Ebrahim Alnefaei
Muharraq Third	Mohamed Isa Ahmed Abdulla Ali
Muharraq Fourth	Ghazi Abdulaziz Yusuf Jaafar Almurbati
Muharraq Fifth	Khaled Saleh Ahmed Buanaq
Muharraq Sixth	Hisham Ahmed Yusuf Ahmed Alasheeri
Muharraq Seventh	Ammar Sami Ali Hasan Qambar
Muharraq Eighth	Yusuf Ahmed Hasan Hohamed Althawadi
Northern First	Kaltham Abdulkareem Jassim
Northern Second	Fatima Abbas Qasim Mohamed
Northern Third	Abdulla Ebrahim Mubarak Khalil Aldoseri
Northern Fourth	Ghazi Faisal Hasan Husain al Rahma
Northern Fifth	Sayed Falah Hashem Falah Abdulla
Northern Sixth	Abdulnabi Salman Ahmed Naser
Northern Seventh	Ahmed Yusuf Ahmed Aldamestani
Northern Eighth	Abdulla Khalifa Juma Abdulkarim Althawadi
Northern Ninth	Yusuf Zainalabddin Mohamed Zainal
Northern Tenth	Basem Salman Mohamed Salman Erhama Almalki
Northern Eleventh	Mohamed Khalifa Abdulla Husain Buhamood
Northern Twelfth	Mahmood Maki Salman Albahrani
Southern First	Ahmed Mohamed Ahmed Saad Alaamer
Southern Second	Isa Ali Jamal Alquadhi
Southern Third	Ahmed Yusuf Abdulqader Mohamed Alansari
Southern Fourth	Ali Ahmed Ali Zayed
Southern Fifth	Fawzia Zainal
Southern Sixth	Abdulrazaq Abdulla Ali Hattab
Southern Seventh	Ali Majed Ali Hasan Almajed Alnoaimi
Southern Eighth	Mohamed Ebrahim Ali Muhana Alsisi Albuainain
Southern Ninth	Bader Saood Jabur Abdulla Aldoseri
Southern Tenth	Isa Yusuf Abdulla Ahmed Aldoseri
Source: Elections 2018, Elections 2018
