= 2005 Asian Men's Youth Handball Championship =

2005 handball championship in Asia

2005 Asian Youth Championship
Tournament details
- Host country: Thailand
- Venue(s): 1 (in 1 host city)
- Dates: 26 June – 2 July 2005
- Teams: 8

Final positions
- Champions: South Korea (1st title)
- Runner-up: Iran
- Third place: Japan
- Fourth place: Bahrain

Tournament statistics
- Matches played: 18
- Goals scored: 1,155 (64.17 per match)

The 2005 Asian Men's Youth Handball Championship (1st tournament) took place in Bangkok from 26 June–2 July. It acts as the Asian qualifying tournament for the 2005 Men's Youth World Handball Championship in Qatar.

== Draw ==
| Group A | Group B |
|---|---|
| South Korea; Iran; Thailand; Macau | Japan; Bahrain; Chinese Taipei; India |

== Preliminary round ==
=== Group A ===
| Team | Pld | W | D | L | GF | GA | GD | Pts |
|---|---|---|---|---|---|---|---|---|
| Iran | 3 | 3 | 0 | 0 | 129 | 67 | +62 | 6 |
| South Korea | 3 | 2 | 0 | 1 | 151 | 70 | +81 | 4 |
| Thailand | 3 | 1 | 0 | 2 | 84 | 108 | −24 | 2 |
| Macau | 3 | 0 | 0 | 3 | 40 | 159 | −119 | 0 |

| 26 June 2005; 18:00 | Thailand | 37–17 | Macau | Nimibutr Stadium, Bangkok |

| 26 June 2005; 19:30 | South Korea | 33–34 | Iran | Nimibutr Stadium, Bangkok |

| 27 June 2005; 14:00 | South Korea | 65–8 | Macau | Nimibutr Stadium, Bangkok |

| 27 June 2005; 17:00 | Iran | 38–19 | Thailand | Nimibutr Stadium, Bangkok |

| 28 June 2005; 11:00 | Iran | 57–15 | Macau | Nimibutr Stadium, Bangkok |
| 28 June 2005; 11:00 | | (27–8) | | Nimibutr Stadium, Bangkok |

| 28 June 2005; 15:30 | South Korea | 53–28 | Thailand | Nimibutr Stadium, Bangkok |
| 28 June 2005; 15:30 | | (27–14) | | Nimibutr Stadium, Bangkok |

=== Group B ===
| Team | Pld | W | D | L | GF | GA | GD | Pts |
|---|---|---|---|---|---|---|---|---|
| Japan | 3 | 3 | 0 | 0 | 115 | 82 | +33 | 6 |
| Bahrain | 3 | 2 | 0 | 1 | 99 | 87 | +12 | 4 |
| Chinese Taipei | 3 | 1 | 0 | 2 | 95 | 91 | +4 | 2 |
| India | 3 | 0 | 0 | 3 | 59 | 108 | −49 | 0 |

| 26 June 2005; 12:30 | Japan | 35–33 | Bahrain | Nimibutr Stadium, Bangkok |
| 26 June 2005; 12:30 | | (17–16) | | Nimibutr Stadium, Bangkok |

| 26 June 2005; 14:00 | Chinese Taipei | 34–19 | India | Nimibutr Stadium, Bangkok |

| 27 June 2005; 11:00 | Japan | 36–13 | India | Nimibutr Stadium, Bangkok |
| 27 June 2005; 11:00 | | (16–7) | | Nimibutr Stadium, Bangkok |

| 27 June 2005; 18:30 | Bahrain | 28–25 | Chinese Taipei | Nimibutr Stadium, Bangkok |

| 28 June 2005; 14:00 | Bahrain | 38–27 | India | Nimibutr Stadium, Bangkok |
| 28 June 2005; 14:00 | | (18–14) | | Nimibutr Stadium, Bangkok |

| 28 June 2005; 17:00 | Japan | 44–36 | Chinese Taipei | Nimibutr Stadium, Bangkok |
| 28 June 2005; 17:00 | | (23–19) | | Nimibutr Stadium, Bangkok |

== Placement 5th–8th ==
=== 7th/8th ===
| 1 July 2005; 11:00 | Macau | 21–32 | India | Nimibutr Stadium, Bangkok |

=== 5th/6th ===
| 1 July 2005; 12:30 | Thailand | 28–45 | Chinese Taipei | Nimibutr Stadium, Bangkok |

== Final round ==
Semifinals
30 June – Bangkok
Iran | 37
Bahrain | 34
30 June – Bangkok
South Korea | 32
Japan | 30

Gold medal match
2 July – Bangkok
Iran | 31
South Korea | 38
Bronze medal match
2 July – Bangkok
Bahrain | 26
Japan | 29

=== Semifinals ===
| 30 June 2005; 15:00 | Iran | 37–34 | Bahrain | Nimibutr Stadium, Bangkok |

| 30 June 2005; 16:30 | South Korea | 32–30 | Japan | Nimibutr Stadium, Bangkok |
| 30 June 2005; 16:30 | | (17–16) | | Nimibutr Stadium, Bangkok |

=== Bronze medal match ===
| 2 July 2005; 13:30 | Bahrain | 26–29 | Japan | Nimibutr Stadium, Bangkok |
| 2 July 2005; 13:30 | | (13–12) | | Nimibutr Stadium, Bangkok |

=== Gold medal match ===
| 2 July 2005; 15:00 | Iran | 31–38 | South Korea | Nimibutr Stadium, Bangkok |

== Final standing ==
| Rank | Team |
|---|---|
| 1st place, gold medalist(s) | South Korea |
| 2nd place, silver medalist(s) | Iran |
| 3rd place, bronze medalist(s) | Japan |
| 4 | Bahrain |
| 5 | Chinese Taipei |
| 6 | Thailand |
| 7 | India |
| 8 | Macau |

| Team qualified for the 2005 Youth World Championship |
