= Asian Men's Youth Handball Championship =

Handball championship in Asia

AHF Asian Men's Youth Handball Championship
- Current season, competition or edition: 2026 Asian Men's Youth Handball Championship
- Sport: Handball
- Founder: Asian Handball Federation
- First season: 2005
- Confederation: Asia
- Most recent champion: Qatar (3rd title)
- Most titles: Qatar; South Korea (3 titles)
- Related competitions: Asian Women's Youth Handball Championship

The Asian Men's Youth Handball Championship is the official competition for youth men's national handball teams of Asia, and takes place every two years. In addition to crowning the Asian champions, the tournament also serves as a qualifying tournament for the Youth World Championship.

== Summary ==
Year	Host	Final			Third place match		
Year	Host	Champion	Score	Runner-up	Third place	Score	Fourth place
2005; Details	(Thailand); Bangkok	South Korea	38–31	Iran	Japan	29–26	Bahrain
2006; Details	(Iran); Tehran	Iran	No playoffs	Qatar	South Korea	No playoffs	Japan
2008; Details	(Jordan); Amman	Kuwait	31–26	Qatar	Iran	31–25	Bahrain
2010; Details	(United Arab Emirates); Abu Dhabi	Qatar	37–30	South Korea	Bahrain	35–35 2OT (4–2) pen	Saudi Arabia
2012; Details	(Bahrain); Manama	Qatar	28–24	Japan	South Korea	18–17	Bahrain
2014; Details	(Jordan); Amman	South Korea	26–25	Qatar	Japan	31–23	Bahrain
2016; Details	(Bahrain); Isa Town	Bahrain	25–23	Japan	South Korea	29–22	Qatar
2018; Details	(Jordan); Amman	Bahrain	34–31	Japan	Chinese Taipei	29–26	Saudi Arabia
2020; Details	(Kazakhstan); Almaty	Cancelled due to the COVID-19 pandemic					
2022; Details	(Bahrain); Isa Town	South Korea	26–22	Iran	Saudi Arabia	26–25	Japan
2024; Details	(Jordan); Amman	Japan	26–24	South Korea	Kuwait	30–26	Saudi Arabia
2026; Details	(Jordan); Amman	Qatar	28–24	Bahrain	South Korea	29–28	Iran

== Medal table ==
Rank	Nation	Gold	Silver	Bronze	Total
1	Qatar	3	3	0	6
2	South Korea	3	2	4	9
3	Bahrain	2	1	1	4
4	Japan	1	3	2	6
5	Iran	1	2	1	4
6	Kuwait	1	0	1	2
7	Chinese Taipei	0	0	1	1
7	Saudi Arabia	0	0	1	1
Totals (8 entries)		11	11	11	33

== Participating nations ==
Nation	(Thailand) 2005	(Iran) 2006	(Jordan) 2008	(United Arab Emirates) 2010	(Bahrain) 2012	(Jordan) 2014	(Bahrain) 2016	(Jordan) 2018	(Bahrain) 2022	(Jordan) 2024	(Jordan) 2026	Years
Bahrain	4th		4th	3rd	4th	4th	1st	1st	5th	5th	2nd	10
China							8th	8th		11th		3
Chinese Taipei	5th		8th	8th	10th			3rd		9th		6
Hong Kong							9th					1
India	7th		11th					6th	10th	13th	10th	6
Iran	2nd	1st	3rd	5th	8th	7th		5th	2nd	6th	4th	10
Iraq			10th	9th	6th	6th	6th	DSQ	9th	10th		8
Japan	3rd	4th	7th	7th	2nd	3rd	2nd	2nd	4th	1st		10
Jordan			9th			8th		7th		7th	7th	5
Kazakhstan				10th								1
Kuwait			1st		9th	5th			6th	3rd	6th	6
Lebanon				11th								1
Macau	8th											1
Oman					12th			11th				2
Qatar		2nd	2nd	1st	1st	2nd	4th	9th	7th	8th	1st	10
Saudi Arabia			6th	4th	5th	9th	5th	4th	3rd	4th	5th	9
South Korea	1st	3rd	5th	2nd	3rd	1st	3rd	DSQ	1st	2nd	3rd	11
Syria					7th			12th			9th	3
Thailand	6th											1
United Arab Emirates				6th				10th	11th	12th		4
Uzbekistan					11th		7th		8th		8th	4
Total	8	4	11	11	12	9	9	14	11	13	10	

== See also ==
- Asian Men's Handball Championship
- Asian Men's Junior Handball Championship
- Asian Women's Handball Championship
- Asian Women's Junior Handball Championship
- Asian Women's Youth Handball Championship
