= 2012 Asian Men's Youth Handball Championship =

2012 handball championship in Asia

2012 Asian Youth Championship
Tournament details
- Host country: Bahrain
- Venue: 2 (in 1 host city)
- Dates: 6–15 September 2012
- Teams: 11

Final positions
- Champions: Qatar (2nd title)
- Runners-up: Japan
- Third place: South Korea
- Fourth place: Bahrain

Tournament statistics
- Matches played: 42
- Goals scored: 2,183 (51.98 per match)

The 2012 Asian Men's Youth Handball Championship (5th tournament) took place in Manama from September 6–15. It acts as the Asian qualifying tournament for the 2013 Men's Youth World Handball Championship.

== Draw ==
| Group A | Group B |
|---|---|
| South Korea; Iran; Chinese Taipei; Uzbekistan; Syria; Bahrain | Qatar; Saudi Arabia; Japan; Iraq; Oman; Kuwait |

== Preliminary round ==
=== Group A ===
| Team | Pld | W | D | L | GF | GA | GD | Pts |
|---|---|---|---|---|---|---|---|---|
| Bahrain | 5 | 4 | 0 | 1 | 143 | 116 | +27 | 8 |
| South Korea | 5 | 4 | 0 | 1 | 189 | 127 | +62 | 8 |
| Iran | 5 | 3 | 0 | 2 | 137 | 124 | +13 | 6 |
| Syria | 5 | 2 | 0 | 3 | 132 | 149 | −17 | 4 |
| Chinese Taipei | 5 | 2 | 0 | 3 | 139 | 150 | −11 | 4 |
| Uzbekistan | 5 | 0 | 0 | 5 | 118 | 192 | −74 | 0 |

| 6 September 2012; 13:00 | Iran | 27–23 | Chinese Taipei | Handball Federation Hall, Manama |
| 6 September 2012; 13:00 | | (11–12) | | Handball Federation Hall, Manama |

| 6 September 2012; 15:00 | Syria | 28–41 | South Korea | Handball Federation Hall, Manama |
| 6 September 2012; 15:00 | | (12–23) | | Handball Federation Hall, Manama |

| 6 September 2012; 19:30 | Uzbekistan | 23–44 | Bahrain | Handball Federation Hall, Manama |
| 6 September 2012; 19:30 | | (9–23) | | Handball Federation Hall, Manama |

| 7 September 2012; 15:00 | Chinese Taipei | 35–23 | Uzbekistan | Handball Federation Hall, Manama |
| 7 September 2012; 15:00 | | (19–14) | | Handball Federation Hall, Manama |

| 7 September 2012; 17:00 | Iran | 33–28 | Syria | Handball Federation Hall, Manama |
| 7 September 2012; 17:00 | | (15–15) | | Handball Federation Hall, Manama |

| 7 September 2012; 19:00 | South Korea | 26–27 | Bahrain | Handball Federation Hall, Manama |
| 7 September 2012; 19:00 | | (11–10) | | Handball Federation Hall, Manama |

| 8 September 2012; 15:00 | South Korea | 47–18 | Uzbekistan | Handball Federation Hall, Manama |
| 8 September 2012; 15:00 | | (24–13) | | Handball Federation Hall, Manama |

| 8 September 2012; 17:00 | Chinese Taipei | 22–25 | Syria | Handball Federation Hall, Manama |
| 8 September 2012; 17:00 | | (12–16) | | Handball Federation Hall, Manama |

| 8 September 2012; 19:00 | Bahrain | 20–16 | Iran | Handball Federation Hall, Manama |
| 8 September 2012; 19:00 | | (10–9) | | Handball Federation Hall, Manama |

| 10 September 2012; 15:00 | Uzbekistan | 25–35 | Iran | Handball Federation Hall, Manama |
| 10 September 2012; 15:00 | | (11–17) | | Handball Federation Hall, Manama |

| 10 September 2012; 17:00 | Chinese Taipei | 28–49 | South Korea | Handball Federation Hall, Manama |
| 10 September 2012; 17:00 | | (15–23) | | Handball Federation Hall, Manama |

| 10 September 2012; 19:00 | Syria | 20–24 | Bahrain | Handball Federation Hall, Manama |
| 10 September 2012; 19:00 | | (13–13) | | Handball Federation Hall, Manama |

| 11 September 2012; 15:00 | Uzbekistan | 29–31 | Syria | Handball Federation Hall, Manama |
| 11 September 2012; 15:00 | | (17–15) | | Handball Federation Hall, Manama |

| 11 September 2012; 17:00 | South Korea | 28–26 | Iran | Handball Federation Hall, Manama |
| 11 September 2012; 17:00 | | (17–14) | | Handball Federation Hall, Manama |

| 11 September 2012; 19:00 | Bahrain | 28–31 | Chinese Taipei | Handball Federation Hall, Manama |
| 11 September 2012; 19:00 | | (12–15) | | Handball Federation Hall, Manama |

=== Group B ===
| Team | Pld | W | D | L | GF | GA | GD | Pts |
|---|---|---|---|---|---|---|---|---|
| Qatar | 5 | 4 | 0 | 1 | 141 | 97 | +44 | 8 |
| Japan | 5 | 4 | 0 | 1 | 164 | 98 | +66 | 8 |
| Iraq | 5 | 3 | 0 | 2 | 101 | 112 | −11 | 6 |
| Saudi Arabia | 5 | 3 | 0 | 2 | 146 | 116 | +30 | 6 |
| Kuwait | 5 | 1 | 0 | 4 | 100 | 125 | −25 | 2 |
| Oman | 5 | 0 | 0 | 5 | 64 | 168 | −104 | 0 |

| 6 September 2012; 13:00 | Saudi Arabia | 26–32 | Japan | Basketball Federation Hall, Manama |
| 6 September 2012; 13:00 | | (14–15) | | Basketball Federation Hall, Manama |

| 6 September 2012; 15:00 | Oman | 10–40 | Qatar | Basketball Federation Hall, Manama |
| 6 September 2012; 15:00 | | (4–16) | | Basketball Federation Hall, Manama |

| 6 September 2012; 19:30 | Iraq | 23–14 | Kuwait | Basketball Federation Hall, Manama |
| 6 September 2012; 19:30 | | (11–6) | | Basketball Federation Hall, Manama |

| 7 September 2012; 15:00 | Japan | 38–15 | Iraq | Basketball Federation Hall, Manama |
| 7 September 2012; 15:00 | | (18–9) | | Basketball Federation Hall, Manama |

| 7 September 2012; 17:00 | Saudi Arabia | 41–14 | Oman | Basketball Federation Hall, Manama |
| 7 September 2012; 17:00 | | (20–9) | | Basketball Federation Hall, Manama |

| 7 September 2012; 19:00 | Qatar | 24–18 | Kuwait | Basketball Federation Hall, Manama |
| 7 September 2012; 19:00 | | (11–9) | | Basketball Federation Hall, Manama |

| 8 September 2012; 15:00 | Qatar | 22–18 | Iraq | Basketball Federation Hall, Manama |
| 8 September 2012; 15:00 | | (11–11) | | Basketball Federation Hall, Manama |

| 8 September 2012; 17:00 | Kuwait | 19–28 | Saudi Arabia | Basketball Federation Hall, Manama |
| 8 September 2012; 17:00 | | (10–18) | | Basketball Federation Hall, Manama |

| 8 September 2012; 19:00 | Japan | 34–12 | Oman | Basketball Federation Hall, Manama |
| 8 September 2012; 19:00 | | (17–7) | | Basketball Federation Hall, Manama |

| 10 September 2012; 15:00 | Iraq | 26–25 | Saudi Arabia | Basketball Federation Hall, Manama |
| 10 September 2012; 15:00 | | (14–12) | | Basketball Federation Hall, Manama |

| 10 September 2012; 17:00 | Japan | 25–30 | Qatar | Basketball Federation Hall, Manama |
| 10 September 2012; 17:00 | | (13–12) | | Basketball Federation Hall, Manama |

| 10 September 2012; 19:00 | Oman | 15–34 | Kuwait | Basketball Federation Hall, Manama |
| 10 September 2012; 19:00 | | (7–17) | | Basketball Federation Hall, Manama |

| 11 September 2012; 15:00 | Kuwait | 15–35 | Japan | Basketball Federation Hall, Manama |
| 11 September 2012; 15:00 | | (7–19) | | Basketball Federation Hall, Manama |

| 11 September 2012; 17:00 | Iraq | 19–13 | Oman | Basketball Federation Hall, Manama |
| 11 September 2012; 17:00 | | (7–6) | | Basketball Federation Hall, Manama |

| 11 September 2012; 19:00 | Qatar | 25–26 | Saudi Arabia | Basketball Federation Hall, Manama |
| 11 September 2012; 19:00 | | (13–15) | | Basketball Federation Hall, Manama |

== Placement 9th–12th ==
Semifinals
13 September – Manama
Chinese Taipei | 26
Oman | 23
13 September – Manama
Kuwait | 31
Uzbekistan | 16

9th/10th
14 September – Manama
Chinese Taipei | 25
Kuwait | 27
11th/12th
14 September – Manama
Oman | 19
Uzbekistan | 31

=== Semifinals ===
| 13 September 2012; 13:00 | Chinese Taipei | 26–23 | Oman | Basketball Federation Hall, Manama |
| 13 September 2012; 13:00 | | (20–9) | | Basketball Federation Hall, Manama |

| 13 September 2012; 15:00 | Kuwait | 31–16 | Uzbekistan | Basketball Federation Hall, Manama |
| 13 September 2012; 15:00 | | (16–10) | | Basketball Federation Hall, Manama |

=== 11th/12th ===
| 14 September 2012; 15:00 | Oman | 19–31 | Uzbekistan | Basketball Federation Hall, Manama |
| 14 September 2012; 15:00 | | (8–16) | | Basketball Federation Hall, Manama |

=== 9th/10th ===
| 14 September 2012; 17:00 | Chinese Taipei | 25–27 | Kuwait | Basketball Federation Hall, Manama |
| 14 September 2012; 17:00 | | (16–12) | | Basketball Federation Hall, Manama |

== Placement 5th–8th ==
Semifinals
13 September – Manama
Iran | 29
Saudi Arabia | 30
13 September – Manama
Iraq | 25
Syria | 23

5th/6th
14 September – Manama
Saudi Arabia | 25
Iraq | 24
7th/8th
14 September – Manama
Iran | 27
Syria | 28

=== Semifinals ===
| 13 September 2012; 13:00 | Iran | 29–30 | Saudi Arabia | Handball Federation Hall, Manama |
| 13 September 2012; 13:00 | | (12–11) | | Handball Federation Hall, Manama |

| 13 September 2012; 15:00 | Iraq | 25–23 | Syria | Handball Federation Hall, Manama |
| 13 September 2012; 15:00 | | (11–11) | | Handball Federation Hall, Manama |

=== 7th/8th ===
| 14 September 2012; 15:00 | Iran | 27–28 | Syria | Handball Federation Hall, Manama |
| 14 September 2012; 15:00 | | (15–13) | | Handball Federation Hall, Manama |

=== 5th/6th ===
| 14 September 2012; 17:00 | Saudi Arabia | 25–24 | Iraq | Handball Federation Hall, Manama |
| 14 September 2012; 17:00 | | (14–12) | | Handball Federation Hall, Manama |

== Final round ==
Semifinals
13 September – Manama
Bahrain | 33
Japan (ET) | 34
13 September – Manama
Qatar | 24
South Korea | 22

Gold medal match
15 September – Manama
Japan | 24
Qatar | 28
Bronze medal match
15 September – Manama
Bahrain | 17
South Korea | 18

=== Semifinals ===
| 13 September 2012; 17:00 | Qatar | 24–22 | South Korea | Handball Federation Hall, Manama |
| 13 September 2012; 17:00 | | (11–9) | | Handball Federation Hall, Manama |

13 September 2012
19:00
Bahrain
33–34 (ET)
Japan
Handball Federation Hall, Manama

(16–15)

FT: 29–29 ET: 4–5

=== Bronze medal match ===
| 15 September 2012; 17:00 | South Korea | 18–17 | Bahrain | Handball Federation Hall, Manama |
| 15 September 2012; 17:00 | | (11–6) | | Handball Federation Hall, Manama |

=== Gold medal match ===
| 15 September 2012; 19:00 | Qatar | 28–24 | Japan | Handball Federation Hall, Manama |
| 15 September 2012; 19:00 | | (14–13) | | Handball Federation Hall, Manama |

== Final standing ==
| Rank | Team |
|---|---|
| 1st place, gold medalist(s) | Qatar |
| 2nd place, silver medalist(s) | Japan |
| 3rd place, bronze medalist(s) | South Korea |
| 4 | Bahrain |
| 5 | Saudi Arabia |
| 6 | Iraq |
| 7 | Syria |
| 8 | Iran |
| 9 | Kuwait |
| 10 | Chinese Taipei |
| 11 | Uzbekistan |
| 12 | Oman |

| Team qualified for the 2013 Youth World Championship |
