= 2016 Asian Men's Youth Handball Championship =

2016 handball championship in Asia

- Logo of 7th Asian Men's Youth Handball Championship

Tournament details
- Host country: Bahrain
- Venue: Khalifa Sports City Stadium (in Manama host cities)
- Dates: 27 August - 5 September 2016
- Teams: 9 (from 1 confederation)

Final positions
- Champions: Bahrain (1st title)
- Runners-up: Japan
- Third place: South Korea
- Fourth place: Qatar

Tournament statistics
- Matches played: 24

The 2016 Asian Men's Youth Handball Championship was the 7th edition of the Asian Men's Youth Handball Championship held from 27 August - 5 September 2016 at Manama, Bahrain under the aegis of Asian Handball Federation. Is also acted as the qualification tournament for the 2017 Men's Youth World Handball Championship to be held in Georgia.

== Preliminary groups ==
Group A	Group B
Bahrain	South Korea
Japan	Qatar
Iraq	~~Iran~~
Saudi Arabia	China
Hong Kong	Uzbekistan

- Islamic Republic of Iran withdrew from the championship after the draw due to security conditions in Bahrain.

== Competition schedule ==
G	Group stage	½	Semi-finals	B	Bronze-medal match	F	Final

Event↓/Date →	Sat 27	Sun 28	Mon 29	Tue 30	Wed 31	Thu 1	Fri 2	Sat 3	Sun 4	Mon 5	
Men	G	G	G	Rest Day	G	G	Rest Day	½		B	F

== Group A ==
Team	Pld	W	D	L	GF	GA	GD	Pts
Bahrain	4	3	1	0	110	82	+28	7
Japan	4	3	1	0	105	84	+21	7
Saudi Arabia	4	2	0	2	105	90	+15	4
Iraq	4	1	0	3	91	91	0	2
Hong Kong	4	0	0	4	60	124	−64	0

27 August 2016; 15:00	Saudi Arabia	24-28	Japan	Khalifa Sports City Stadium, Manama

27 August 2016; 19:00	Hong Kong	17-34	Bahrain	Khalifa Sports City Stadium, Manama

28 August 2016; 15:00	Iraq	22-27	Japan	Khalifa Sports City Stadium, Manama

28 August 2016; 19:00	Saudi Arabia	23-25	Bahrain	Khalifa Sports City Stadium, Manama

29 August 2016; 15:00	Japan	27-15	Hong Kong	Khalifa Sports City Stadium, Manama

29 August 2016; 19:00	Saudi Arabia	24-21	Iraq	Khalifa Sports City Stadium, Manama

31 August 2016; 15:00	Hong Kong	16 - 34	Saudi Arabia	Khalifa Sports City Stadium, Manama

31 August 2016; 19:00	Iraq	19 - 28	Bahrain	Khalifa Sports City Stadium, Manama

1 September 2016; 17:00	Hong Kong	12 - 29	Iraq	Khalifa Sports City Stadium, Manama

1 September 2016; 19:00	Bahrain	23 - 23	Japan	Khalifa Sports City Stadium, Manama

== Group B ==
Team	Pld	W	D	L	GF	GA	GD	Pts
South Korea	3	3	0	0	131	64	+67	6
Qatar	3	2	0	1	65	70	−5	4
China	3	1	0	2	80	99	−19	2
Uzbekistan	3	0	0	3	71	114	−43	0

27 August 2016; 13:00	China	20-27	Qatar	Khalifa Sports City Stadium, Manama, Bahrain

27 August 2016; 17:00	Uzbekistan	27-53	South Korea	Khalifa Sports City Stadium, Manama, Bahrain

28 August 2016; 17:00	China	24-43	South Korea	Khalifa Sports City Stadium, Manama, Bahrain

29 August 2016; 17:00	Qatar	25-15	Uzbekistan	Khalifa Sports City Stadium, Manama, Bahrain

31 August 2016; 17:00	Uzbekistan	29 - 36	China	Khalifa Sports City Stadium, Manama, Bahrain

1 September 2016; 15:00	South Korea	35 - 13	Qatar	Khalifa Sports City Stadium, Manama, Bahrain

== 5th–8th Placement Matches ==
=== 5th–8th Placement Semifinals ===
3 September 2016; 13:00	Saudi Arabia	44 - 23	Uzbekistan	Khalifa Sports City Stadium, Manama

3 September 2016; 15:00	China	28 - 30	Iraq	Khalifa Sports City Stadium, Manama

=== 7th–8th-place match ===
4 September 2016; 17:00	Uzbekistan	28 - 23	China	Khalifa Sports City Stadium, Manama

=== 5th–6th-place match ===
4 September 2016; 19:00	Saudi Arabia	27 - 23	Iraq	Khalifa Sports City Stadium, Manama

== Knockout stage ==
=== Semifinal matches ===
3 September 2016; 17:00	Bahrain	23 - 19	Qatar	Khalifa Sports City Stadium, Manama

3 September 2016; 19:00	Japan	30 - 29	South Korea	Khalifa Sports City Stadium, Manama

=== Bronze-medal match ===
5 September 2016; 17:00	Qatar	23 - 29	South Korea	Khalifa Sports City Stadium, Manama

=== Gold-medal match ===
5 September 2016; 19:00	Bahrain	25 - 23	Japan	Khalifa Sports City Stadium, Manama

== Final standings ==
Rank	Team
1st place, gold medalist(s)	Bahrain (1st title) (Host)
2nd place, silver medalist(s)	Japan
3rd place, bronze medalist(s)	South Korea (Defending Champion)
4	Qatar
5	Saudi Arabia
6	Iraq
7	Uzbekistan
8	China
9	Hong Kong

Team qualified for the 2017 Youth World Championship
