= 2006 Asian Men's Youth Handball Championship =

2006 handball championship in Asia

2006 Asian Youth Championship
Tournament details
- Host country: Iran
- Venue(s): 1 (in 1 host city)
- Dates: 25–30 June 2006
- Teams: 4

Final positions
- Champions: Iran (1st title)
- Runner-up: Qatar
- Third place: South Korea
- Fourth place: Japan

Tournament statistics
- Matches played: 6
- Goals scored: 390 (65 per match)

The 2006 Asian Men's Youth Handball Championship (2nd tournament) took place in Tehran from 25 June–30 June. It acts as the Asian qualifying tournament for the 2007 Men's Youth World Handball Championship in Bahrain.

== Results ==
Team	Pld	W	D	L	GF	GA	GD	Pts
Iran	3	3	0	0	115	104	+11	6
Qatar	3	2	0	1	101	96	+5	4
South Korea	3	1	0	2	95	94	+1	2
Japan	3	0	0	3	79	96	−17	0

25 June 2006; 16:00	Japan	30–37	Iran	Handball Hall, Tehran
25 June 2006; 16:00		(16–21)		Handball Hall, Tehran

26 June 2006; 16:00	South Korea	30–33	Qatar	Handball Hall, Tehran
26 June 2006; 16:00		(15–15)		Handball Hall, Tehran

27 June 2006; 16:00	Japan	23–29	South Korea	Handball Hall, Tehran
27 June 2006; 16:00		(9–14)		Handball Hall, Tehran

28 June 2006; 16:00	Iran	40–38	Qatar	Handball Hall, Tehran
28 June 2006; 16:00		(18–17)		Handball Hall, Tehran

30 June 2006; 15:00	South Korea	36–38	Iran	Handball Hall, Tehran
30 June 2006; 15:00		(18–20)		Handball Hall, Tehran

30 June 2006; 17:00	Japan	26–30	Qatar	Handball Hall, Tehran
30 June 2006; 17:00		(11–18)		Handball Hall, Tehran

== Final standing ==
Rank	Team
1st place, gold medalist(s)	Iran
2nd place, silver medalist(s)	Qatar
3rd place, bronze medalist(s)	South Korea
4	Japan

Team qualified for the 2007 Youth World Championship
