= South Korea men's national youth handball team =

South Korea

Information
- Association: Korea Handball Federation

Colours
1st	2nd

Results

IHF U-19 World Championship
- Appearances: 8 (First in 2005)
- Best result: (silver) Runners-Up : (2005)

Asian Youth Championship
- Best result: Champions (2005, 2014, 2022)
- Last updated on Unknown.

The South Korea national youth handball team is the national under-18 handball team of South Korea. Controlled by the Korea Handball Federation, that is an affiliate of the International Handball Federation IHF as well as a member of the Asian Handball Federation AHF, The team represents South Korea in international matches.

== Statistics ==
=== Youth Olympic Games ===
Champions Runners up Third place Fourth place

Youth Olympic Games record
Year	Round	Position	GP	W	D	L	GS	GA	GD
(Singapore) 2010	Didn't Qualify								
(China) 2014	Didn't Qualify								
(Argentina) 2018	No Handball Event								
(Senegal) 2022	No Handball Event								
Total	0 / 2	0 Titles							

=== World Championship record ===
Champions Runners up Third place Fourth place

Year	Round	Position	GP	W	D*	L	GS	GA	GD
(Qatar) 2005	Final	2nd place							
(Bahrain) 2007		11th place							
(Tunisia) 2009	Didn't Qualify								
(Argentina) 2011		11th place							
(Hungary) 2013		21st place							
(Russia) 2015		13th place							
(Georgia (country)) 2017		12th place							
(North Macedonia) 2019	Didn't Qualify								
(Croatia) 2023		25th place							
(Egypt) 2025		25th place							
Total	8/10	0 Titles							
