= Japan men's national youth handball team =

Japan

Information
- Association: Japan Handball Association

Colours
1st	2nd

Results

IHF U-19 World Championship
- Appearances: 6 (First in 2013)
- Best result: 8th place : (2017)

Asian Youth Championship
- Best result: Runners-Up : (2012, 2016, 2018)
- Last updated on Unknown.

The Japan national youth handball team is the national under–18 handball team of Japan. It is controlled by the Japan Handball Association, and is an affiliate of the International Handball Federation as well as a member of the Asian Handball Federation. The team represents Japan in international matches.

== Statistics ==
=== Youth Olympic Games ===
Champions Runners up Third place Fourth place

Youth Olympic Games record
Year	Round	Position	GP	W	D	L	GS	GA	GD
(Singapore) 2010	Didn't qualify								
(China) 2014	Didn't qualify								
(Argentina) 2018	No handball event								
(Senegal) 2022	No handball event								
Total	0 / 2	0 Titles							

=== World Championship record ===
Champions Runners up Third place Fourth place

Year	Round	Position	GP	W	D*	L	GS	GA	GD
(Qatar) 2005	Did not qualify								
(Bahrain) 2007	Did not qualify								
(Tunisia) 2009	Did not qualify								
(Argentina) 2011	Did not qualify								
(Hungary) 2013		17th place							
(Russia) 2015		20th place							
(Georgia (country)) 2017	quarter-finals	8th place							
(North Macedonia) 2019		9th place							
(Croatia) 2023		21st place							
(Egypt) 2025		14th place							
Total	6/10	0 Titles							
