= 2005 Men's Youth World Handball Championship =

Handball championship edition

2005 Youth World Championship

Tournament details
- Host country: Qatar
- Venue(s): 1 (in 1 host city)
- Dates: August 3–11
- Teams: 10 (from 4 confederations)

Final positions
- Champions: Serbia and Montenegro (1st title)
- Runner-up: South Korea
- Third place: Croatia
- Fourth place: Denmark

Tournament statistics
- Matches played: 27
- Goals scored: 1,393 (51.59 per match)
- Top scorer(s): (South Korea) Eom Hyo-Won (53)

The 2005 Men's Youth World Handball Championship (1st tournament) took place in Qatar from 3 August to 11 August.

== Preliminary round ==
=== Group A ===
| Team | Pld | W | D | L | GF | GA | GD | Pts | Tiebreaker |
|---|---|---|---|---|---|---|---|---|---|
| Serbia and Montenegro | 4 | 4 | 0 | 0 | 142 | 100 | +42 | 8 | |
| South Korea | 4 | 3 | 0 | 1 | 126 | 119 | +7 | 6 | |
| Qatar | 4 | 1 | 1 | 2 | 128 | 115 | +13 | 3 | 1 PT / 0 GD |
| Argentina | 4 | 1 | 1 | 2 | 118 | 117 | +1 | 3 | 1 PT / 0 GD |
| Morocco | 4 | 0 | 0 | 4 | 77 | 140 | −63 | 0 | |

| August 3; 19:30 | Qatar | 38–19 | Morocco | Al-Gharafa Sports Club Hall, Doha; Referees: Brunovski, Canda (SVK) |
| August 3; 19:30 | Al-Deri 9 | (22–9) | Tatby 4 | Al-Gharafa Sports Club Hall, Doha; Referees: Brunovski, Canda (SVK) |
| August 3; 19:30 | 2× (yellow card) 4× (suspension) | Report | 3× (yellow card) 8× (suspension) 1× (red card) | Al-Gharafa Sports Club Hall, Doha; Referees: Brunovski, Canda (SVK) |

| August 3; 21:30 | South Korea | 30–29 | Argentina | Al-Gharafa Sports Club Hall, Doha; Referees: Sanya, Yusuf (NGR) |
| August 3; 21:30 | Eom H.W. 10 | (16–14) | Altenbach 6 | Al-Gharafa Sports Club Hall, Doha; Referees: Sanya, Yusuf (NGR) |
| August 3; 21:30 | 3× (yellow card) 8× (suspension) 1× (red card) | Report | 3× (yellow card) 5× (suspension) | Al-Gharafa Sports Club Hall, Doha; Referees: Sanya, Yusuf (NGR) |

| August 4; 18:30 | Serbia and Montenegro | 35–27 | Argentina | Al-Gharafa Sports Club Hall, Doha; Referees: Gousko, Repkin (BLR) |
| August 4; 18:30 | Marković 7 | (18–13) | Simonet 6 | Al-Gharafa Sports Club Hall, Doha; Referees: Gousko, Repkin (BLR) |
| August 4; 18:30 | 3× (yellow card) 8× (suspension) | Report | 3× (yellow card) 3× (suspension) | Al-Gharafa Sports Club Hall, Doha; Referees: Gousko, Repkin (BLR) |

| August 4; 20:30 | Morocco | 23–29 | South Korea | Al-Gharafa Sports Club Hall, Doha; Referees: Aparecido Pinto, Aires Menezes (BRA) |
| August 4; 20:30 | Louas 7 | (8–18) | Eom H.W. 5 | Al-Gharafa Sports Club Hall, Doha; Referees: Aparecido Pinto, Aires Menezes (BRA) |
| August 4; 20:30 | 4× (yellow card) 5× (suspension) 1× (red card) | Report | 3× (yellow card) 4× (suspension) | Al-Gharafa Sports Club Hall, Doha; Referees: Aparecido Pinto, Aires Menezes (BRA) |

| August 5; 18:30 | Qatar | 25–28 | Serbia and Montenegro | Al-Gharafa Sports Club Hall, Doha; Referees: Aparecido Pinto, Aires Menezes (BRA) |
| August 5; 18:30 | Al-Ghamdi 6 | (11–15) | Nenadić 7 | Al-Gharafa Sports Club Hall, Doha; Referees: Aparecido Pinto, Aires Menezes (BRA) |
| August 5; 18:30 | 3× (yellow card) 6× (suspension) | Report | 5× (yellow card) 7× (suspension) 1× (red card) | Al-Gharafa Sports Club Hall, Doha; Referees: Aparecido Pinto, Aires Menezes (BRA) |

| August 6; 18:30 | South Korea | 35–32 | Qatar | Al-Gharafa Sports Club Hall, Doha; Referees: Pandžić, Šatordžija (BIH) |
| August 6; 18:30 | Eom H.W. 10 | (15–13) | Al-Hajri, Al-Baloushi 8 | Al-Gharafa Sports Club Hall, Doha; Referees: Pandžić, Šatordžija (BIH) |
| August 6; 18:30 | 3× (yellow card) 7× (suspension) | Report | 3× (yellow card) 10× (suspension) 2× (red card) | Al-Gharafa Sports Club Hall, Doha; Referees: Pandžić, Šatordžija (BIH) |

| August 6; 20:30 | Argentina | 29–19 | Morocco | Al-Gharafa Sports Club Hall, Doha; Referees: Aparecido Pinto, Aires Menezes (BRA) |
| August 6; 20:30 | Simonet 6 | (16–9) | Ennaciri 4 | Al-Gharafa Sports Club Hall, Doha; Referees: Aparecido Pinto, Aires Menezes (BRA) |
| August 6; 20:30 | 3× (yellow card) 2× (suspension) | Report | 3× (yellow card) 5× (suspension) | Al-Gharafa Sports Club Hall, Doha; Referees: Aparecido Pinto, Aires Menezes (BRA) |

| August 7; 18:30 | Morocco | 16–44 | Serbia and Montenegro | Al-Gharafa Sports Club Hall, Doha; Referees: Sanya, Yusuf (NGR) |
| August 7; 18:30 | Bnousinane 7 | (9–20) | Vukas 16 | Al-Gharafa Sports Club Hall, Doha; Referees: Sanya, Yusuf (NGR) |
| August 7; 18:30 | 3× (yellow card) 3× (suspension) | Report | 4× (yellow card) 8× (suspension) | Al-Gharafa Sports Club Hall, Doha; Referees: Sanya, Yusuf (NGR) |

| August 8; 18:30 | Serbia and Montenegro | 35–32 | South Korea | Al-Gharafa Sports Club Hall, Doha; Referees: Gousko, Repkin (BLR) |
| August 8; 18:30 | Šešum 10 | (16–12) | Eom H.W. 18 | Al-Gharafa Sports Club Hall, Doha; Referees: Gousko, Repkin (BLR) |
| August 8; 18:30 | 3× (yellow card) 6× (suspension) | Report | 4× (yellow card) 1× (suspension) | Al-Gharafa Sports Club Hall, Doha; Referees: Gousko, Repkin (BLR) |

| August 8; 20:30 | Argentina | 33–33 | Qatar | Al-Gharafa Sports Club Hall, Doha; Referees: Brunovski, Canda (SVK) |
| August 8; 20:30 | Simonet 9 | (17–18) | Al-Hajri, Al-Ghamdi 7 | Al-Gharafa Sports Club Hall, Doha; Referees: Brunovski, Canda (SVK) |
| August 8; 20:30 | 4× (yellow card) 5× (suspension) | Report | 3× (yellow card) 7× (suspension) | Al-Gharafa Sports Club Hall, Doha; Referees: Brunovski, Canda (SVK) |

=== Group B ===
| Team | Pld | W | D | L | GF | GA | GD | Pts |
|---|---|---|---|---|---|---|---|---|
| Denmark | 4 | 4 | 0 | 0 | 137 | 88 | +49 | 8 |
| Croatia | 4 | 3 | 0 | 1 | 123 | 114 | +9 | 6 |
| Egypt | 4 | 2 | 0 | 2 | 126 | 122 | +4 | 4 |
| Iran | 4 | 1 | 0 | 3 | 95 | 128 | −33 | 2 |
| Tunisia | 4 | 0 | 0 | 4 | 93 | 122 | −29 | 0 |

| August 3; 14:30 | Iran | 32–34 | Egypt | Al-Gharafa Sports Club Hall, Doha; Referees: Gousko, Repkin (BLR) |
| August 3; 14:30 | Khalighi 11 | (19–18) | Hasaballa 9 | Al-Gharafa Sports Club Hall, Doha; Referees: Gousko, Repkin (BLR) |
| August 3; 14:30 | 3× (yellow card) 3× (suspension) | Report | 3× (yellow card) 5× (suspension) | Al-Gharafa Sports Club Hall, Doha; Referees: Gousko, Repkin (BLR) |

| August 3; 16:30 | Denmark | 32–18 | Tunisia | Al-Gharafa Sports Club Hall, Doha; Referees: Pandžić, Šatordžija (BIH) |
| August 3; 16:30 | Mazur 6 | (16–9) | Mrabet 5 | Al-Gharafa Sports Club Hall, Doha; Referees: Pandžić, Šatordžija (BIH) |
| August 3; 16:30 | 3× (yellow card) 7× (suspension) | Report | 3× (yellow card) 3× (suspension) 1× (red card) | Al-Gharafa Sports Club Hall, Doha; Referees: Pandžić, Šatordžija (BIH) |

| August 4; 14:30 | Croatia | 30–29 | Egypt | Al-Gharafa Sports Club Hall, Doha; Referees: Brunovski, Canda (SVK) |
| August 4; 14:30 | Dzono 6 | (14–16) | Soliman, K. Ibrahim 7 | Al-Gharafa Sports Club Hall, Doha; Referees: Brunovski, Canda (SVK) |
| August 4; 14:30 | 2× (yellow card) 6× (suspension) 1× (red card) | Report | 2× (yellow card) 9× (suspension) 1× (red card) | Al-Gharafa Sports Club Hall, Doha; Referees: Brunovski, Canda (SVK) |

| August 4; 16:30 | Tunisia | 23–25 | Iran | Al-Gharafa Sports Club Hall, Doha; Referees: Al-Heel, Al-Hammad (QAT) |
| August 4; 16:30 | Mahmod, Mrabet 6 | (10–11) | Esteki 8 | Al-Gharafa Sports Club Hall, Doha; Referees: Al-Heel, Al-Hammad (QAT) |
| August 4; 16:30 | 3× (yellow card) 6× (suspension) 1× (red card) | Report | 3× (yellow card) 3× (suspension) | Al-Gharafa Sports Club Hall, Doha; Referees: Al-Heel, Al-Hammad (QAT) |

| August 5; 16:30 | Denmark | 38–23 | Croatia | Al-Gharafa Sports Club Hall, Doha; Referees: Gousko, Repkin (BLR) |
| August 5; 16:30 | Christiansen 8 | (22–11) | Blažević 9 | Al-Gharafa Sports Club Hall, Doha; Referees: Gousko, Repkin (BLR) |
| August 5; 16:30 | 3× (suspension) | Report | 4× (yellow card) 2× (suspension) | Al-Gharafa Sports Club Hall, Doha; Referees: Gousko, Repkin (BLR) |

| August 6; 14:30 | Egypt | 33–26 | Tunisia | Al-Gharafa Sports Club Hall, Doha; Referees: Brunovski, Canda (SVK) |
| August 6; 14:30 | El-Zoghby 9 | (16–14) | Slama 8 | Al-Gharafa Sports Club Hall, Doha; Referees: Brunovski, Canda (SVK) |
| August 6; 14:30 | 3× (yellow card) 4× (suspension) | Report | 3× (yellow card) 6× (suspension) | Al-Gharafa Sports Club Hall, Doha; Referees: Brunovski, Canda (SVK) |

| August 6; 16:30 | Iran | 17–33 | Denmark | Al-Gharafa Sports Club Hall, Doha; Referees: Al-Heel, Al-Hammad (QAT) |
| August 6; 16:30 | Khalighi 5 | (8–15) | Toftegaard 6 | Al-Gharafa Sports Club Hall, Doha; Referees: Al-Heel, Al-Hammad (QAT) |
| August 6; 16:30 | 3× (yellow card) 4× (suspension) | Report | 2× (yellow card) 3× (suspension) | Al-Gharafa Sports Club Hall, Doha; Referees: Al-Heel, Al-Hammad (QAT) |

| August 7; 16:30 | Tunisia | 26–32 | Croatia | Al-Gharafa Sports Club Hall, Doha; Referees: Pandžić, Šatordžija (BIH) |
| August 7; 16:30 | Mrabet 11 | (11–16) | Čupić, Blažević 8 | Al-Gharafa Sports Club Hall, Doha; Referees: Pandžić, Šatordžija (BIH) |
| August 7; 16:30 | 3× (yellow card) 4× (suspension) | Report | 3× (yellow card) 6× (suspension) | Al-Gharafa Sports Club Hall, Doha; Referees: Pandžić, Šatordžija (BIH) |

| August 8; 14:30 | Croatia | 38–21 | Iran | Al-Gharafa Sports Club Hall, Doha; Referees: Aparecido Pinto, Aires Menezes (BRA) |
| August 8; 14:30 | Blažević 7 | (20–8) | Pourghasemi 6 | Al-Gharafa Sports Club Hall, Doha; Referees: Aparecido Pinto, Aires Menezes (BRA) |
| August 8; 14:30 | 3× (yellow card) 3× (suspension) | Report | 3× (yellow card) 3× (suspension) | Al-Gharafa Sports Club Hall, Doha; Referees: Aparecido Pinto, Aires Menezes (BRA) |

| August 8; 16:30 | Egypt | 30–34 | Denmark | Al-Gharafa Sports Club Hall, Doha; Referees: Al-Heel, Al-Hammad (QAT) |
| August 8; 16:30 | El-Zoghby, El-Nemrawi 6 | (17–18) | Hundstrup 9 | Al-Gharafa Sports Club Hall, Doha; Referees: Al-Heel, Al-Hammad (QAT) |
| August 8; 16:30 | 4× (yellow card) 7× (suspension) 2× (red card) | Report | 3× (yellow card) 4× (suspension) | Al-Gharafa Sports Club Hall, Doha; Referees: Al-Heel, Al-Hammad (QAT) |

== Placement matches ==
=== 9th/10th ===
| August 10; 11:30 | Morocco | 26–33 | Tunisia | Al-Gharafa Sports Club Hall, Doha; Referees: Sanya, Yusuf (NGR) |
| August 10; 11:30 | Tatby 7 | (15–13) | Slama 9 | Al-Gharafa Sports Club Hall, Doha; Referees: Sanya, Yusuf (NGR) |
| August 10; 11:30 | 3× (yellow card) 3× (suspension) | Report | 3× (yellow card) 7× (suspension) | Al-Gharafa Sports Club Hall, Doha; Referees: Sanya, Yusuf (NGR) |

=== 7th/8th ===
| August 10; 14:00 | Iran | 22–25 | Argentina | Al-Gharafa Sports Club Hall, Doha; Referees: Pandžić, Šatordžija (BIH) |
| August 10; 14:00 | Rajabi 5 | (12–16) | Vidal, Simonet, Fasciglione, Poncet 4 | Al-Gharafa Sports Club Hall, Doha; Referees: Pandžić, Šatordžija (BIH) |
| August 10; 14:00 | 3× (yellow card) 5× (suspension) 1× (red card) | Report | 3× (yellow card) 4× (suspension) | Al-Gharafa Sports Club Hall, Doha; Referees: Pandžić, Šatordžija (BIH) |

=== 5th/6th ===
| August 11; 14:00 | Qatar | 36–34 | Egypt | Al-Gharafa Sports Club Hall, Doha; Referees: Gousko, Repkin (BLR) |
| August 11; 14:00 | Al-Ghamdi, Al-Baloushi 8 | (17–13) | El-Zoghby 10 | Al-Gharafa Sports Club Hall, Doha; Referees: Gousko, Repkin (BLR) |
| August 11; 14:00 | 3× (yellow card) 3× (suspension) | Report | 3× (yellow card) 3× (suspension) 1× (red card) | Al-Gharafa Sports Club Hall, Doha; Referees: Gousko, Repkin (BLR) |

== Final round ==
Semifinal
August 10 – Doha
Serbia and Montenegro | 30
Croatia | 29
August 10 – Doha
Denmark | 31
South Korea | 32

Final
August 11 – Doha
Serbia and Montenegro | 39
South Korea | 23
Third place
August 11 – Doha
Croatia | 32
Denmark | 31

=== Semifinals ===
| August 10; 16:30 | Serbia and Montenegro | 30–29 | Croatia | Al-Gharafa Sports Club Hall, Doha; Referees: Brunovski, Canda (SVK) |
| August 10; 16:30 | Šešum 9 | (17–15) | Blažević 11 | Al-Gharafa Sports Club Hall, Doha; Referees: Brunovski, Canda (SVK) |
| August 10; 16:30 | 3× (yellow card) 4× (suspension) | Report | 4× (yellow card) 5× (suspension) | Al-Gharafa Sports Club Hall, Doha; Referees: Brunovski, Canda (SVK) |

| August 10; 19:00 | Denmark | 31–32 | South Korea | Al-Gharafa Sports Club Hall, Doha; Referees: Aparecido Pinto, Aires Menezes (BRA) |
| August 10; 19:00 | Hansen 10 | (15–15) | Eom H.W. 10 | Al-Gharafa Sports Club Hall, Doha; Referees: Aparecido Pinto, Aires Menezes (BRA) |
| August 10; 19:00 | 4× (yellow card) 3× (suspension) | Report | 3× (yellow card) 3× (suspension) | Al-Gharafa Sports Club Hall, Doha; Referees: Aparecido Pinto, Aires Menezes (BRA) |

=== Bronze-medal match ===
| August 11; 16:30 | Croatia | 32–31 | Denmark | Al-Gharafa Sports Club Hall, Doha; Referees: Al-Heel, Al-Hammad (QAT) |
| August 11; 16:30 | Čupić 8 | (13–16) | Christiansen, Hansen 5 | Al-Gharafa Sports Club Hall, Doha; Referees: Al-Heel, Al-Hammad (QAT) |
| August 11; 16:30 | 4× (yellow card) 7× (suspension) 1× (red card) | Report | 3× (yellow card) 4× (suspension) | Al-Gharafa Sports Club Hall, Doha; Referees: Al-Heel, Al-Hammad (QAT) |

=== Gold-medal match ===
| August 11; 19:00 | Serbia and Montenegro | 39–23 | South Korea | Al-Gharafa Sports Club Hall, Doha; Referees: Brunovski, Canda (SVK) |
| August 11; 19:00 | Šešum, Nenadić 8 | (20–8) | Pag P.G. 7 | Al-Gharafa Sports Club Hall, Doha; Referees: Brunovski, Canda (SVK) |
| August 11; 19:00 | 2× (yellow card) 8× (suspension) | Report | 2× (yellow card) 5× (suspension) | Al-Gharafa Sports Club Hall, Doha; Referees: Brunovski, Canda (SVK) |

== Final standings ==
| Rank | Team |
|---|---|
| Gold medal | Serbia and Montenegro |
| Silver medal | South Korea |
| Bronze medal | Croatia |
| 4 | Denmark |
| 5 | Qatar |
| 6 | Egypt |
| 7 | Argentina |
| 8 | Iran |
| 9 | Tunisia |
| 10 | Morocco |

== Medallists ==
| Gold | Silver | Bronze |
|---|---|---|
| Serbia and Montenegro | South Korea | Croatia |
| Vladimir Perišić; Andrija Pejović; Mirko Milošević; Momir Rnić; Uroš Lazić; Žarko Pejović; Žarko Šešum; Petar Nenadić; Milos Maksimović; Dobrivoje Marković; Vladimir Abadzić; Milan Vukas; Milan Ivancev; Rajko Prodanović; Bojan Beljanski; Žarko Marković; Coach: Veselin Vujović | Seomoon Hwan; Choi Jang-Hun; Jung Jin-Ho; Kim Sung-Jin; Pag Pyeon-Gyu; Bae Sang-Wook; Lim Hyo-Seob; Chung Tae-Hwan; Eom Hyo-Won; Yong Min-Ho; Jin Jung-Hoon; Kwon Young-Jun; Hong Jin-Ki; Kim Seok-Man; Han Ki-Bong; Park Cheol-Jung; Coach: ? | Mate Šunjić; Mate Svalina; Domagoj Duvnjak; Antonio Kovačević; Marko Kopljar; Nikola Džono; Ivan Ribić; Vladimir Bičvić; Mislav Lončar; Tomislav Brnas; Vladimir Gruičić; Luka Bumbak; Frano Veraja; Josip Nekić; Ivan Čupić; Alen Blažević; Coach: Dinko Vuleta |
