= Iraq men's national handball team =

Iraq

Information
- Nickname: Lions of Mesopotamia
- Association: Iraqi Handball Federation
- Coach: Sayed Ali
- Assistant coach: Mohammed Kadhim; Mustafa Yaseen

Colours
1st	2nd

Results

Asian Championship
- Appearances: 7 (First in 1977)
- Best result: 5th (1977)
- Last updated on Unknown.

Iraq men's national handball team
Medal record

Islamic Solidarity Games
Bronze medal – third place	2017 Baku	Team

The Iraq national handball team is controlled by the Iraqi Handball Federation and competes in international handball competitions.

== Competitive record ==
Champions Runners-up Third place Fourth place

=== Asian Championship ===
Asian Championship record
Year	Round	Position	Pld	W	D	L	GF	GA	GD
(Kuwait) 1977	Match for 5th place	5th of 9	3	1	0	2	47	63	−16
(Lebanon) 2010	Match for 9th place	10th of 12	4	1	0	3	95	121	−26
(Bahrain) 2014	Match for 9th place	10th of 12	7	1	0	6	152	212	−60
(Kuwait) 2020	Placement round	9th of 13	7	5	0	2	237	178	+49
(Saudi Arabia) 2022	Match for 5th place	6th of 16	7	2	1	4	200	210	–10
(Bahrain) 2024	Match for 7th place	8th of 16	7	1	3	3	199	178	+21
(Kuwait) 2026	Match for 7th place	7th of 16	7	3	0	4	184	207	−23
Total	7/22	0 Titles	42	14	4	24	1114	1169	−55

=== Asian Games ===
Asian Games record
Games	Round	Position	Pld	W	D	L	GF	GA	GD
(Indonesia) 2018 Jakarta–Palembang	Match for 7th place	7th of 13	7	3	1	3	196	186	+10
Total	1/10	0 Titles	7	3	1	3	196	186	+10

=== Islamic Solidarity Games ===
Islamic Solidarity Games record
Games	Round	Position	Pld	W	D	L	GF	GA	GD
(Saudi Arabia) 2005 Mecca	Match for 10th place	10th of 13	2	0	0	2	58	68	−10
(Azerbaijan) 2017 Baku	Match for bronze medal game	3rd of 8	5	3	0	2	146	122	+24
Total	2/2	0 Titles	7	3	0	4	204	190	+14

== Team ==
=== Current squad ===
A 20-player squad was announced on 16 December for the 2022 Asian Men's Handball Championship in Saudi Arabia.

Matches and goals are correct as of 16 December 2021.

Head coach: Sherif Moemen

No.	Pos.	Name	Date of birth (age)	Height	App.	Goals	Club
1	GK	Bilal Hasan Alwan Alsabbagh*	1 April 1986 (age 39)	1.90 m	12	0	(Iraq)
2	RB	Raed Abd Zaid Alwan Al Baghdadi*	24 January 1989 (age 37)	1.75 m	7	6	(Iraq) Al-Karkh SC
7	P	Hussein Ali Hamzah Ibadi*	30 January 1985 (age 41)	1.80 m	12	67	(Iraq) Al-Shorta SC
11	CB	Jasim Ghassab Mohammed*	27 January 1996 (age 30)	1.75 m	10	43	(Iraq) Al-Jaish SC
12	GK	Muntadher Qasim Jebur Ali*	17 January 1998 (age 28)	1.90 m	2	0	(Iraq)
16	GK	Ahmed Makki Saleh Al Azzawi*	2 March 1990 (age 36)	1.82 m	12	0	(Iraq) Al-Karkh SC
18	LW	Mustafa Mahmmud	10 October 1990 (age 35)	1.86 m	5	11	(Iraq)
22	RW	Mohanad Adil Talib Al Behadili*	1 May 1992 (age 33)	1.77 m	9	16	(Iraq)
23	CB	Ali Tariq	17 February 1990 (age 36)	1.80 m	2	2	(Iraq)
24	LW	Ali Abdulridha Al Akayshee*	23 May 1991 (age 34)	1.88 m	12	29	(Iraq) Al-Shorta SC
44	CB	Majid Abdulridha Al Akayshee*	19 May 1996 (age 29)	1.72 m	9	32	(Iraq) Al-Jaish SC
55	P	Mohammed Sahib Rashid*	6 January 1986 (age 40)	1.80 m	12	12	(Iraq) Al-Shorta SC
69	LB	Karrar Kadhim Albattat*	6 June 2002 (age 23)	1.96 m	2	6	(Iraq)
77	RB	Maytham Oudah Al Behadilit*	2 April 1989 (age 36)	1.86 m	12	18	(Iraq)
89	P	Mustafa Mohammed Al Azzawi*	12 May 1989 (age 36)	1.94 m	12	3	(Iraq) Al-Jaish SC
92	LB	Ali Adnan Chyad Abdlkan*	15 February 1992 (age 34)	1.98 m	12	57	(Iraq) Al-Shorta SC
94	RW	Baderaldeen Nasern*	13 November 1994 (age 31)	1.83 m	10	36	(Iraq) Al-Jaish SC
96	LW	Mohammed Ali Mahdi Al Azzawi*	31 October 1997 (age 28)	1.80 m	4	4	(Iraq) Al-Jaish SC

=== Coaching staff ===
Role	Name
Head coach	(Egypt) Sherif Moemen
Assistant coach	
Team manager	
Goalkeeping coach	(Egypt) Kadhim Nasir
Doctor	
Bodytherapist	
Physiotherapist	

=== List of managers ===
1. Champion
2. 2nd place
3. 3rd place

Name	From	To	Honours
Iraq Azad Mohammed Amin	1975	1975	Palestine Handball Cup 1975/Cairo
Iraq Saad Mohsen	1977	1977	1977 Asian Men's Handball Championship
Iraq Saad Mohsen	1977	1977	Palestine Handball Cup 1977/Rabat 3rd place
Iraq Azad Mohammed Amin Soviet Union Stephan	1979	1979	Palestine Handball Cup 1979/Kuwait 2nd place
Iraq Dafer Saheb	1985	1985	1985 Pan Arab Games
Iraq Dafer Saheb	1985	1985	Ankara Friendly Championship 1985/Turkey 2nd place
Iraq Dafer Saheb	1985	1985	Hong Kong Friendly Championship 1985/Hong Kong 3rd place
Iraq Dafer Saheb	1987	1987	Baghdad Friendly Championship 1987/Baghdad Champion
Iraq	1988	1988	Baghdad Friendly Championship 1988/Baghdad 3rd place
Iraq Dafer Saheb	1989	1989	Baghdad Friendly Championship 1989/Baghdad 3rd place
Iraq Dafer Saheb	1990	1990	Baghdad Friendly Championship 1990/Baghdad 2nd place
Iraq Dafer Saheb	1990	1990	Bosphorus Friendly Championship 1990/Hungary 2nd place
Iraq Dafer Saheb	1990	1990	Al Ahram Friendly Championship 1990/Egypt
Iraq Mohamed Hamza	1999	1999	1999 Pan Arab Games
Iraq	2007	2007	2007 Pan Arab Games
Iraq Dafer Saheb	2010	2010	2010 Asian Men's Handball Championship
Iraq Dafer Saheb	2014	2014	2014 Asian Men's Handball Championship
Iraq Kutaiba Ahmad	2015	2015	Handball at the 2016 Summer Olympics – Men's qualification
Iraq Dafer Saheb	2017	2017	2017 Islamic Solidarity Games 3rd place
Iraq Dafer Saheb	2018	2018	Handball at the 2018 Asian Games
Iraq Dafer Saheb	2019	2019	Championship President Heydar Aliyev Champion

== Kits ==
Iraq's traditional home kit is green, with either or white trimmings. The away kit is traditionally blue, with white trimmings.

=== Home ===
Handball at the 2018 Asian Games
green & white
Handball at the 2018 Asian Games
White & green

=== Away ===
Handball at the 2018 Asian Games
blue & white
