= 2019 Men's Youth World Handball Championship =

International handball tournament held in Macedonia

Tournament details
- Host country: North Macedonia
- Venue(s): 2 (in 1 host city)
- Dates: 6–18 August
- Teams: 24 (from 5 confederations)

Final positions
- Champions: Egypt (1st title)
- Runner-up: Germany
- Third place: Denmark
- Fourth place: Portugal

Tournament statistics
- Matches played: 92
- Goals scored: 5,124 (55.7 per match)
- Top scorer(s): (Egypt) Hassan Walid (51 goals)

Awards
- Best player: (Egypt) Ahmed Hesham

The 2019 IHF Men's Youth World Championship (under-19) was the eighth edition of the tournament, held from 6 to 18 August 2019 in Skopje, North Macedonia.

Egypt won their first title by defeating Germany in the final.

== Qualified teams ==
Competition	Dates	Vacancies	Qualified
Host nation		1	North Macedonia
2018 European Men's U-18 Handball Championship	9–19 August 2018	11+1	Sweden; Iceland; Denmark; Croatia; Spain; Germany; France; Serbia; Slovenia; Hungary; Norway; Portugal (substitute for Oceania)
2018 African Men's Youth Handball Championship	15–22 September 2018	3	Egypt; Tunisia; Nigeria
2018 Asian Men's Youth Handball Championship	16–26 September 2018	4	Bahrain; Japan; Chinese Taipei; Saudi Arabia
IHF Trophy – North American & the Caribbean	17–21 November 2018	1	Canada
2019 South and Central American Men's Youth Handball Championship	8–12 May 2019	3	Brazil; Argentina; Chile

== Draw ==
The draw was held on 29 May 2019 in Basel, Switzerland.

=== Seedings ===
The seedings were announced on 17 May 2019.

Pot 1	Pot 2	Pot 3	Pot 4	Pot 5	Pot 6
Sweden; Iceland; Denmark; Croatia	Spain; Germany; France; Bahrain	North Macedonia; Serbia; Slovenia; Hungary	Egypt; Japan; Norway; Tunisia	Brazil; Argentina; Chile; Chinese Taipei	Nigeria; Saudi Arabia; Portugal; Canada

== Preliminary round ==
All times are local (UTC+2).

=== Group A ===
Pos	Team	Pld	W	D	L	GF	GA	GD	Pts	Qualification
1	Croatia	5	5	0	0	168	103	+65	10	Round of 16
2	Norway	5	3	1	1	157	131	+26	7 (Note: Norway 28–28 Spain)	Round of 16
3	Spain	5	3	1	1	141	117	+24	7	Round of 16
4	Slovenia	5	2	0	3	132	141	−9	4	Round of 16
5	Saudi Arabia	5	1	0	4	112	162	−50	2	
6	Chile	5	0	0	5	120	176	−56	0	

Source: IHF
Rules for classification: 1) points; 2) head-to-head points; 3) head-to-head goal difference; 4) head-to-head number of goals scored; 5) goal difference.
Notes:

6 August 2019; 10:30	Croatia	32–22	Norway	Jane Sandanski Arena, Skopje; Attendance: 100; Referees: Jovandić, Sekulić (SRB)
6 August 2019; 10:30	Mileta 7	(16–7)	Norberg 4	Jane Sandanski Arena, Skopje; Attendance: 100; Referees: Jovandić, Sekulić (SRB)
6 August 2019; 10:30	1× (yellow card) 3× (suspension)	Report	2× (yellow card) 7× (suspension)	Jane Sandanski Arena, Skopje; Attendance: 100; Referees: Jovandić, Sekulić (SRB)

6 August 2019; 12:30	Spain	36–21	Saudi Arabia	Jane Sandanski Arena, Skopje; Attendance: 100; Referees: Reyes, Zuñiga (CUB)
6 August 2019; 12:30	Pascual 8	(15–10)	Mohammed 6	Jane Sandanski Arena, Skopje; Attendance: 100; Referees: Reyes, Zuñiga (CUB)
6 August 2019; 12:30	1× (yellow card) 4× (suspension) 1× (red card)	Report	2× (yellow card) 2× (suspension)	Jane Sandanski Arena, Skopje; Attendance: 100; Referees: Reyes, Zuñiga (CUB)

6 August 2019; 14:30	Slovenia	35–30	Chile	Jane Sandanski Arena, Skopje; Attendance: 100; Referees: Emam, Hedaia (EGY)
6 August 2019; 14:30	Kljun 11	(18–18)	Aedo 8	Jane Sandanski Arena, Skopje; Attendance: 100; Referees: Emam, Hedaia (EGY)
6 August 2019; 14:30	2× (yellow card) 6× (suspension)	Report	1× (yellow card) 5× (suspension)	Jane Sandanski Arena, Skopje; Attendance: 100; Referees: Emam, Hedaia (EGY)

8 August 2019; 16:30	Norway	28–28	Spain	Jane Sandanski Arena, Skopje; Attendance: 150; Referees: Carmaux, Mursch (FRA)
8 August 2019; 16:30	Gjermundnes 6	(13–13)	Díaz, Pascual 5	Jane Sandanski Arena, Skopje; Attendance: 150; Referees: Carmaux, Mursch (FRA)
8 August 2019; 16:30	1× (yellow card) 10× (suspension)	Report	2× (suspension)	Jane Sandanski Arena, Skopje; Attendance: 150; Referees: Carmaux, Mursch (FRA)

8 August 2019; 18:30	Chile	21–43	Croatia	Jane Sandanski Arena, Skopje; Attendance: 86; Referees: Al-Wattani, Wamber (BHR)
8 August 2019; 18:30	Cayul 7	(11–23)	Sinčić 10	Jane Sandanski Arena, Skopje; Attendance: 86; Referees: Al-Wattani, Wamber (BHR)
8 August 2019; 18:30	3× (suspension)	Report	1× (yellow card) 5× (suspension)	Jane Sandanski Arena, Skopje; Attendance: 86; Referees: Al-Wattani, Wamber (BHR)

8 August 2019; 20:30	Saudi Arabia	22–30	Slovenia	Jane Sandanski Arena, Skopje; Attendance: 100; Referees: Doychinov, Goretsov (BUL)
8 August 2019; 20:30	Hassan, Mohammedalhassan 5	(9–16)	E. Jovičič, Kljun 7	Jane Sandanski Arena, Skopje; Attendance: 100; Referees: Doychinov, Goretsov (BUL)
8 August 2019; 20:30	2× (yellow card) 6× (suspension)	Report	1× (yellow card) 3× (suspension)	Jane Sandanski Arena, Skopje; Attendance: 100; Referees: Doychinov, Goretsov (BUL)

9 August 2019; 16:30	Croatia	36–17	Saudi Arabia	Jane Sandanski Arena, Skopje; Referees: Reyes, Zuñiga (CUB)
9 August 2019; 16:30	Mileta 6	(19–13)	Hassan 4	Jane Sandanski Arena, Skopje; Referees: Reyes, Zuñiga (CUB)
9 August 2019; 16:30	1× (yellow card) 5× (suspension)	Report	6× (suspension)	Jane Sandanski Arena, Skopje; Referees: Reyes, Zuñiga (CUB)

9 August 2019; 18:30	Spain	24–21	Slovenia	Jane Sandanski Arena, Skopje; Referees: Jovandić, Sekulić (SRB)
9 August 2019; 18:30	five players 4	(10–7)	E. Jovičič 5	Jane Sandanski Arena, Skopje; Referees: Jovandić, Sekulić (SRB)
9 August 2019; 18:30	1× (yellow card) 4× (suspension)	Report	2× (suspension)	Jane Sandanski Arena, Skopje; Referees: Jovandić, Sekulić (SRB)

9 August 2019; 20:30	Norway	38–23	Chile	Jane Sandanski Arena, Skopje; Attendance: 72; Referees: García, Paolantoni (ARG)
9 August 2019; 20:30	Rekstad 7	(20–9)	Paya 7	Jane Sandanski Arena, Skopje; Attendance: 72; Referees: García, Paolantoni (ARG)
9 August 2019; 20:30	2× (yellow card) 5× (suspension)	Report	3× (suspension)	Jane Sandanski Arena, Skopje; Attendance: 72; Referees: García, Paolantoni (ARG)

11 August 2019; 16:30	Spain	31–21	Chile	Jane Sandanski Arena, Skopje; Attendance: 100; Referees: Merz, Schilha (GER)
11 August 2019; 16:30	Izquierdo 6	(13–15)	Cancino, Paya 5	Jane Sandanski Arena, Skopje; Attendance: 100; Referees: Merz, Schilha (GER)
11 August 2019; 16:30	3× (yellow card) 2× (suspension)	Report	4× (suspension)	Jane Sandanski Arena, Skopje; Attendance: 100; Referees: Merz, Schilha (GER)

11 August 2019; 18:30	Slovenia	21–31	Croatia	Jane Sandanski Arena, Skopje; Attendance: 100; Referees: García, Paolantoni (ARG)
11 August 2019; 18:30	S. Jovičič 8	(11–16)	Mileta 6	Jane Sandanski Arena, Skopje; Attendance: 100; Referees: García, Paolantoni (ARG)
11 August 2019; 18:30	1× (yellow card) 2× (suspension)	Report	2× (yellow card) 7× (suspension)	Jane Sandanski Arena, Skopje; Attendance: 100; Referees: García, Paolantoni (ARG)

11 August 2019; 20:30	Saudi Arabia	23–35	Norway	Jane Sandanski Arena, Skopje; Attendance: 100; Referees: Diop, Faye (SEN)
11 August 2019; 20:30	Hassan 5	(9–18)	Rekstad 7	Jane Sandanski Arena, Skopje; Attendance: 100; Referees: Diop, Faye (SEN)
11 August 2019; 20:30	1× (yellow card) 5× (suspension)	Report	3× (suspension)	Jane Sandanski Arena, Skopje; Attendance: 100; Referees: Diop, Faye (SEN)

12 August 2019; 16:30	Chile	25–29	Saudi Arabia	Jane Sandanski Arena, Skopje; Referees: Bolic, Hurich (AUT)
12 August 2019; 16:30	Paya 7	(11–13)	Mohammed 8	Jane Sandanski Arena, Skopje; Referees: Bolic, Hurich (AUT)
12 August 2019; 16:30	1× (yellow card) 7× (suspension) 1× (red card)	Report	5× (suspension)	Jane Sandanski Arena, Skopje; Referees: Bolic, Hurich (AUT)

12 August 2019; 18:30	Slovenia	25–34	Norway	Jane Sandanski Arena, Skopje; Referees: Lee, Koo (KOR)
12 August 2019; 18:30	Hočevar 10	(11–22)	Lillelien 6	Jane Sandanski Arena, Skopje; Referees: Lee, Koo (KOR)
12 August 2019; 18:30	2× (yellow card) 5× (suspension)	Report	2× (yellow card) 1× (suspension)	Jane Sandanski Arena, Skopje; Referees: Lee, Koo (KOR)

12 August 2019; 20:30	Croatia	26–22	Spain	Jane Sandanski Arena, Skopje; Referees: Bíró, Kiss (HUN)
12 August 2019; 20:30	Rukavina 5	(13–11)	three players 4	Jane Sandanski Arena, Skopje; Referees: Bíró, Kiss (HUN)
12 August 2019; 20:30	5× (suspension)	Report	1× (yellow card) 2× (suspension)	Jane Sandanski Arena, Skopje; Referees: Bíró, Kiss (HUN)

=== Group B ===
Pos	Team	Pld	W	D	L	GF	GA	GD	Pts	Qualification
1	Egypt	5	4	0	1	170	126	+44	8	Round of 16
2	Sweden	5	3	1	1	176	126	+50	7 (Note: Sweden 32–32 France)	Round of 16
3	France	5	3	1	1	161	121	+40	7	Round of 16
4	Hungary	5	3	0	2	157	118	+39	6	Round of 16
5	Chinese Taipei	5	1	0	4	119	171	−52	2	
6	Canada	5	0	0	5	82	203	−121	0	

Source: IHF
Rules for classification: 1) points; 2) head-to-head points; 3) head-to-head goal difference; 4) head-to-head number of goals scored; 5) goal difference.
Notes:

6 August 2019; 16:30	Sweden	29–32	Egypt	Jane Sandanski Arena, Skopje; Referees: Covalciuc, Covalciuc (MDA)
6 August 2019; 16:30	Persson 8	(15–16)	Hesham, Walid 6	Jane Sandanski Arena, Skopje; Referees: Covalciuc, Covalciuc (MDA)
6 August 2019; 16:30	2× (yellow card) 1× (suspension)	Report	1× (yellow card) 4× (suspension)	Jane Sandanski Arena, Skopje; Referees: Covalciuc, Covalciuc (MDA)

6 August 2019; 18:30	France	44–16	Canada	Jane Sandanski Arena, Skopje; Attendance: 75; Referees: Al-Zayyat, Eialawad (JOR)
6 August 2019; 18:30	Paschal 8	(23–7)	Barri 7	Jane Sandanski Arena, Skopje; Attendance: 75; Referees: Al-Zayyat, Eialawad (JOR)
6 August 2019; 18:30	1× (yellow card) 4× (suspension)	Report	2× (yellow card)	Jane Sandanski Arena, Skopje; Attendance: 75; Referees: Al-Zayyat, Eialawad (JOR)

6 August 2019; 20:30	Hungary	38–20	Chinese Taipei	Jane Sandanski Arena, Skopje; Attendance: 75; Referees: Hussein, Imran (IRQ)
6 August 2019; 20:30	Hornyák 9	(20–12)	Yang L. 5	Jane Sandanski Arena, Skopje; Attendance: 75; Referees: Hussein, Imran (IRQ)
6 August 2019; 20:30	2× (yellow card) 1× (suspension)	Report	1× (yellow card) 5× (suspension)	Jane Sandanski Arena, Skopje; Attendance: 75; Referees: Hussein, Imran (IRQ)

7 August 2019; 16:30	Egypt	24–28	France	Jane Sandanski Arena, Skopje; Attendance: 100; Referees: Merz, Schilha (GER)
7 August 2019; 16:30	Hany, Reda 5	(12–14)	Paschal 8	Jane Sandanski Arena, Skopje; Attendance: 100; Referees: Merz, Schilha (GER)
7 August 2019; 16:30	1× (yellow card) 6× (suspension) 1× (red card)	Report	4× (suspension)	Jane Sandanski Arena, Skopje; Attendance: 100; Referees: Merz, Schilha (GER)

7 August 2019; 18:30	Chinese Taipei	18–48	Sweden	Jane Sandanski Arena, Skopje; Attendance: 100; Referees: Diop, Faye (SEN)
7 August 2019; 18:30	Hsieh 6	(9–22)	four players 7	Jane Sandanski Arena, Skopje; Attendance: 100; Referees: Diop, Faye (SEN)
7 August 2019; 18:30	2× (suspension)	Report	1× (yellow card) 3× (suspension)	Jane Sandanski Arena, Skopje; Attendance: 100; Referees: Diop, Faye (SEN)

7 August 2019; 20:30	Canada	13–41	Hungary	Jane Sandanski Arena, Skopje; Referees: Al-Wattani, Qamber (BHR)
7 August 2019; 20:30	Barri 5	(6–18)	Hornyák, Kecskés 8	Jane Sandanski Arena, Skopje; Referees: Al-Wattani, Qamber (BHR)
7 August 2019; 20:30	4× (suspension)	Report	1× (yellow card)	Jane Sandanski Arena, Skopje; Referees: Al-Wattani, Qamber (BHR)

9 August 2019; 10:30	Sweden	38–16	Canada	Jane Sandanski Arena, Skopje; Referees: Hussein, Imran (IRQ)
9 August 2019; 10:30	Hilding 10	(14–7)	Barri 6	Jane Sandanski Arena, Skopje; Referees: Hussein, Imran (IRQ)
9 August 2019; 10:30	1× (yellow card) 4× (suspension)	Report	2× (yellow card) 1× (suspension)	Jane Sandanski Arena, Skopje; Referees: Hussein, Imran (IRQ)

9 August 2019; 12:30	France	25–26	Hungary	Jane Sandanski Arena, Skopje; Attendance: 100; Referees: Covalciuc, Covalciuc (MDA)
9 August 2019; 12:30	Ntanzi 8	(13–13)	Kecskés 6	Jane Sandanski Arena, Skopje; Attendance: 100; Referees: Covalciuc, Covalciuc (MDA)
9 August 2019; 12:30	1× (yellow card) 3× (suspension)	Report	1× (yellow card) 1× (suspension)	Jane Sandanski Arena, Skopje; Attendance: 100; Referees: Covalciuc, Covalciuc (MDA)

9 August 2019; 14:30	Egypt	36–25	Chinese Taipei	Jane Sandanski Arena, Skopje; Referees: Diop, Faye (SEN)
9 August 2019; 14:30	Al-Aaeldin 6	(18–15)	Hsu Y. 7	Jane Sandanski Arena, Skopje; Referees: Diop, Faye (SEN)
9 August 2019; 14:30	2× (yellow card) 5× (suspension)	Report	3× (suspension)	Jane Sandanski Arena, Skopje; Referees: Diop, Faye (SEN)

10 August 2019; 16:30	France	32–23	Chinese Taipei	Jane Sandanski Arena, Skopje; Referees: Al-Zayyat, Eialawad (JOR)
10 August 2019; 16:30	Paschal 6	(18–11)	Ting 6	Jane Sandanski Arena, Skopje; Referees: Al-Zayyat, Eialawad (JOR)
10 August 2019; 16:30	1× (yellow card) 2× (suspension)	Report	1× (yellow card) 5× (suspension)	Jane Sandanski Arena, Skopje; Referees: Al-Zayyat, Eialawad (JOR)

10 August 2019; 18:30	Hungary	28–29	Sweden	Jane Sandanski Arena, Skopje; Referees: Koo, Lee (KOR)
10 August 2019; 18:30	Hornyák 8	(16–12)	three players 6	Jane Sandanski Arena, Skopje; Referees: Koo, Lee (KOR)
10 August 2019; 18:30	1× (yellow card) 2× (suspension)	Report	2× (yellow card) 2× (suspension)	Jane Sandanski Arena, Skopje; Referees: Koo, Lee (KOR)

10 August 2019; 20:30	Canada	20–47	Egypt	Jane Sandanski Arena, Skopje; Attendance: 100; Referees: Reyes, Zuñiga (CUB)
10 August 2019; 20:30	Barri 9	(12–24)	Ahmed, El-Sayed 7	Jane Sandanski Arena, Skopje; Attendance: 100; Referees: Reyes, Zuñiga (CUB)
10 August 2019; 20:30	10× (suspension)	Report	1× (yellow card) 2× (suspension)	Jane Sandanski Arena, Skopje; Attendance: 100; Referees: Reyes, Zuñiga (CUB)

12 August 2019; 10:30	Chinese Taipei	33–17	Canada	Jane Sandanski Arena, Skopje; Referees: Al-Wattani, Qamber (BHR)
12 August 2019; 10:30	Hsu Y. 7	(17–6)	Fodor 3	Jane Sandanski Arena, Skopje; Referees: Al-Wattani, Qamber (BHR)
12 August 2019; 10:30	1× (yellow card) 5× (suspension)	Report	6× (suspension)	Jane Sandanski Arena, Skopje; Referees: Al-Wattani, Qamber (BHR)

12 August 2019; 12:30	Hungary	24–31	Egypt	Jane Sandanski Arena, Skopje; Referees: Doychinov, Goretsov (BUL)
12 August 2019; 12:30	four players 3	(14–19)	Hesham 7	Jane Sandanski Arena, Skopje; Referees: Doychinov, Goretsov (BUL)
12 August 2019; 12:30	1× (yellow card) 3× (suspension)	Report	1× (yellow card) 5× (suspension)	Jane Sandanski Arena, Skopje; Referees: Doychinov, Goretsov (BUL)

12 August 2019; 14:30	Sweden	32–32	France	Jane Sandanski Arena, Skopje; Referees: Jovandić, Sekulić (SRB)
12 August 2019; 14:30	three players 5	(13–15)	Salou 7	Jane Sandanski Arena, Skopje; Referees: Jovandić, Sekulić (SRB)
12 August 2019; 14:30	4× (suspension)	Report	3× (suspension)	Jane Sandanski Arena, Skopje; Referees: Jovandić, Sekulić (SRB)

=== Group C ===
Pos	Team	Pld	W	D	L	GF	GA	GD	Pts	Qualification
1	Denmark	5	5	0	0	159	119	+40	10	Round of 16
2	Japan	5	4	0	1	145	132	+13	8	Round of 16
3	Argentina	5	3	0	2	123	124	−1	6	Round of 16
4	North Macedonia (H)	5	2	0	3	132	142	−10	4	Round of 16
5	Bahrain	5	1	0	4	138	143	−5	2	
6	Nigeria	5	0	0	5	136	173	−37	0	

Source: IHF
Rules for classification: 1) points; 2) head-to-head points; 3) head-to-head goal difference; 4) head-to-head number of goals scored; 5) goal difference.
(H) Hosts

6 August 2019; 16:30	Denmark	30–23	Japan	Boris Trajkovski Sports Center, Skopje; Attendance: 50; Referees: Merz, Schilha (GER)
6 August 2019; 16:30	Cieslak 10	(18–11)	Yasushira 7	Boris Trajkovski Sports Center, Skopje; Attendance: 50; Referees: Merz, Schilha (GER)
6 August 2019; 16:30	1× (yellow card) 2× (suspension)	Report	2× (yellow card) 4× (suspension)	Boris Trajkovski Sports Center, Skopje; Attendance: 50; Referees: Merz, Schilha (GER)

6 August 2019; 18:30	Bahrain	36–28	Nigeria	Boris Trajkovski Sports Center, Skopje; Attendance: 66; Referees: Bolic, Hurich (AUT)
6 August 2019; 18:30	Mohamed 13	(17–13)	Gbawuan, Yusuf 7	Boris Trajkovski Sports Center, Skopje; Attendance: 66; Referees: Bolic, Hurich (AUT)
6 August 2019; 18:30	1× (yellow card) 5× (suspension)	Report	1× (yellow card) 5× (suspension)	Boris Trajkovski Sports Center, Skopje; Attendance: 66; Referees: Bolic, Hurich (AUT)

6 August 2019; 20:30	North Macedonia	20–23	Argentina	Boris Trajkovski Sports Center, Skopje; Attendance: 1,500; Referees: Bíró, Kiss (HUN)
6 August 2019; 20:30	Kosteski 6	(13–9)	S. Barcelo 7	Boris Trajkovski Sports Center, Skopje; Attendance: 1,500; Referees: Bíró, Kiss (HUN)
6 August 2019; 20:30	1× (yellow card) 6× (suspension)	Report	1× (yellow card) 4× (suspension)	Boris Trajkovski Sports Center, Skopje; Attendance: 1,500; Referees: Bíró, Kiss (HUN)

8 August 2019; 16:30	Japan	27–24	Bahrain	Boris Trajkovski Sports Center, Skopje; Attendance: 50; Referees: Diop, Faye (SEN)
8 August 2019; 16:30	Fujikawa, Tsutaya 5	(14–11)	Qambar 6	Boris Trajkovski Sports Center, Skopje; Attendance: 50; Referees: Diop, Faye (SEN)
8 August 2019; 16:30	2× (yellow card) 5× (suspension)	Report	3× (yellow card) 2× (suspension)	Boris Trajkovski Sports Center, Skopje; Attendance: 50; Referees: Diop, Faye (SEN)

8 August 2019; 18:30	Argentina	19–29	Denmark	Boris Trajkovski Sports Center, Skopje; Attendance: 100; Referees: Bolic, Hurich (AUT)
8 August 2019; 18:30	Elst, Uzner 4	(11–15)	Jessen 7	Boris Trajkovski Sports Center, Skopje; Attendance: 100; Referees: Bolic, Hurich (AUT)
8 August 2019; 18:30	2× (yellow card) 4× (suspension)	Report	1× (yellow card) 4× (suspension)	Boris Trajkovski Sports Center, Skopje; Attendance: 100; Referees: Bolic, Hurich (AUT)

8 August 2019; 20:30	Nigeria	34–37	North Macedonia	Boris Trajkovski Sports Center, Skopje; Attendance: 500; Referees: Emam, Hedaia (EGY)
8 August 2019; 20:30	Ekpodio 11	(16–18)	Kosteski 13	Boris Trajkovski Sports Center, Skopje; Attendance: 500; Referees: Emam, Hedaia (EGY)
8 August 2019; 20:30	8× (suspension) 1× (red card)	Report	3× (yellow card) 3× (suspension)	Boris Trajkovski Sports Center, Skopje; Attendance: 500; Referees: Emam, Hedaia (EGY)

9 August 2019; 16:30	Denmark	35–22	Nigeria	Boris Trajkovski Sports Center, Skopje; Attendance: 100; Referees: Al-Wattani, Qamber (BHR)
9 August 2019; 16:30	Cieslak, Refsgaard 6	(21–8)	Yusuf 10	Boris Trajkovski Sports Center, Skopje; Attendance: 100; Referees: Al-Wattani, Qamber (BHR)
9 August 2019; 16:30	2× (yellow card) 2× (suspension)	Report	6× (suspension) 1× (red card)	Boris Trajkovski Sports Center, Skopje; Attendance: 100; Referees: Al-Wattani, Qamber (BHR)

9 August 2019; 18:30	Japan	29–26	Argentina	Boris Trajkovski Sports Center, Skopje; Attendance: 50; Referees: Al-Zayyat, Eialawad (JOR)
9 August 2019; 18:30	Tsutaya, Yasushira 7	(18–14)	J. Barcelo, Elst 5	Boris Trajkovski Sports Center, Skopje; Attendance: 50; Referees: Al-Zayyat, Eialawad (JOR)
9 August 2019; 18:30	2× (yellow card) 2× (suspension)	Report	2× (suspension)	Boris Trajkovski Sports Center, Skopje; Attendance: 50; Referees: Al-Zayyat, Eialawad (JOR)

9 August 2019; 20:30	Bahrain	25–27	North Macedonia	Boris Trajkovski Sports Center, Skopje; Attendance: 2,000; Referees: Merz, Schilha (GER)
9 August 2019; 20:30	Ali 11	(9–12)	Serafimov 10	Boris Trajkovski Sports Center, Skopje; Attendance: 2,000; Referees: Merz, Schilha (GER)
9 August 2019; 20:30	1× (yellow card) 5× (suspension)	Report	2× (yellow card) 4× (suspension)	Boris Trajkovski Sports Center, Skopje; Attendance: 2,000; Referees: Merz, Schilha (GER)

11 August 2019; 16:30	Bahrain	24–25	Argentina	Boris Trajkovski Sports Center, Skopje; Attendance: 100; Referees: Emam, Hedaia (EGY)
11 August 2019; 16:30	Mohamed 7	(10–10)	J. Barcelo 5	Boris Trajkovski Sports Center, Skopje; Attendance: 100; Referees: Emam, Hedaia (EGY)
11 August 2019; 16:30	3× (yellow card) 3× (suspension)	Report	2× (yellow card) 3× (suspension)	Boris Trajkovski Sports Center, Skopje; Attendance: 100; Referees: Emam, Hedaia (EGY)

11 August 2019; 18:30	Nigeria	30–35	Japan	Boris Trajkovski Sports Center, Skopje; Attendance: 111; Referees: Reyes, Zuñiga (CUB)
11 August 2019; 18:30	Dikko 8	(9–18)	Kani 9	Boris Trajkovski Sports Center, Skopje; Attendance: 111; Referees: Reyes, Zuñiga (CUB)
11 August 2019; 18:30	6× (suspension)	Report	1× (yellow card) 3× (suspension) 1× (red card)	Boris Trajkovski Sports Center, Skopje; Attendance: 111; Referees: Reyes, Zuñiga (CUB)

11 August 2019; 20:30	North Macedonia	26–29	Denmark	Boris Trajkovski Sports Center, Skopje; Attendance: 2,000; Referees: Jovandić, Sekulić (SRB)
11 August 2019; 20:30	Serafimov 9	(11–13)	Cieslak, Hoxer Hangaard 6	Boris Trajkovski Sports Center, Skopje; Attendance: 2,000; Referees: Jovandić, Sekulić (SRB)
11 August 2019; 20:30	1× (yellow card) 1× (suspension)	Report	1× (yellow card) 6× (suspension)	Boris Trajkovski Sports Center, Skopje; Attendance: 2,000; Referees: Jovandić, Sekulić (SRB)

12 August 2019; 16:30	Argentina	30–22	Nigeria	Boris Trajkovski Sports Center, Skopje; Attendance: 100; Referees: Hussein, Imran (IRQ)
12 August 2019; 16:30	Forti 6	(10–10)	Ekpodio 7	Boris Trajkovski Sports Center, Skopje; Attendance: 100; Referees: Hussein, Imran (IRQ)
12 August 2019; 16:30	1× (yellow card) 1× (suspension)	Report	1× (yellow card) 4× (suspension) 1× (red card)	Boris Trajkovski Sports Center, Skopje; Attendance: 100; Referees: Hussein, Imran (IRQ)

12 August 2019; 18:30	Denmark	36–29	Bahrain	Boris Trajkovski Sports Center, Skopje; Attendance: 150; Referees: Al-Zayyat, Eialawad (JOR)
12 August 2019; 18:30	Wosniak 8	(17–12)	Afrooz 6	Boris Trajkovski Sports Center, Skopje; Attendance: 150; Referees: Al-Zayyat, Eialawad (JOR)
12 August 2019; 18:30	5× (suspension)	Report	2× (yellow card) 6× (suspension)	Boris Trajkovski Sports Center, Skopje; Attendance: 150; Referees: Al-Zayyat, Eialawad (JOR)

12 August 2019; 20:30	North Macedonia	22–31	Japan	Boris Trajkovski Sports Center, Skopje; Attendance: 2,500; Referees: Covalciuc, Covalciuc (MDA)
12 August 2019; 20:30	Kosteski 8	(11–15)	Haruta 5	Boris Trajkovski Sports Center, Skopje; Attendance: 2,500; Referees: Covalciuc, Covalciuc (MDA)
12 August 2019; 20:30	2× (yellow card) 2× (suspension)	Report	1× (suspension)	Boris Trajkovski Sports Center, Skopje; Attendance: 2,500; Referees: Covalciuc, Covalciuc (MDA)

=== Group D ===
Pos	Team	Pld	W	D	L	GF	GA	GD	Pts	Qualification
1	Portugal	5	5	0	0	149	124	+25	10	Round of 16
2	Germany	5	4	0	1	146	114	+32	8	Round of 16
3	Iceland	5	3	0	2	127	122	+5	6	Round of 16
4	Tunisia	5	2	0	3	110	139	−29	4	Round of 16
5	Serbia	5	1	0	4	118	127	−9	2	
6	Brazil	5	0	0	5	126	150	−24	0	

Source: IHF
Rules for classification: 1) points; 2) head-to-head points; 3) head-to-head goal difference; 4) head-to-head number of goals scored; 5) goal difference.

6 August 2019; 10:30	Iceland	25–20	Tunisia	Boris Trajkovski Sports Center, Skopje; Attendance: 50; Referees: Koo, Lee (KOR)
6 August 2019; 10:30	Gautason 6	(12–6)	Bacha 5	Boris Trajkovski Sports Center, Skopje; Attendance: 50; Referees: Koo, Lee (KOR)
6 August 2019; 10:30	5× (suspension)	Report	2× (yellow card) 3× (suspension) 1× (red card)	Boris Trajkovski Sports Center, Skopje; Attendance: 50; Referees: Koo, Lee (KOR)

6 August 2019; 12:30	Germany	26–33	Portugal	Boris Trajkovski Sports Center, Skopje; Attendance: 65; Referees: Carmaux, Mursch (FRA)
6 August 2019; 12:30	Tobeler 7	(15–18)	Costa 11	Boris Trajkovski Sports Center, Skopje; Attendance: 65; Referees: Carmaux, Mursch (FRA)
6 August 2019; 12:30	1× (yellow card) 5× (suspension)	Report	5× (suspension)	Boris Trajkovski Sports Center, Skopje; Attendance: 65; Referees: Carmaux, Mursch (FRA)

6 August 2019; 14:30	Serbia	30–24	Brazil	Boris Trajkovski Sports Center, Skopje; Attendance: 50; Referees: Doychinov, Goretsov (BUL)
6 August 2019; 14:30	Nikolić 9	(14–11)	Braga, Oliveira 6	Boris Trajkovski Sports Center, Skopje; Attendance: 50; Referees: Doychinov, Goretsov (BUL)
6 August 2019; 14:30	5× (suspension) 1× (red card)	Report	1× (yellow card) 5× (suspension)	Boris Trajkovski Sports Center, Skopje; Attendance: 50; Referees: Doychinov, Goretsov (BUL)

7 August 2019; 16:30	Tunisia	15–36	Germany	Boris Trajkovski Sports Center, Skopje; Attendance: 50; Referees: García, Paolantoni (ARG)
7 August 2019; 16:30	Smaoui 4	(10–15)	Mavers, Tobeler 5	Boris Trajkovski Sports Center, Skopje; Attendance: 50; Referees: García, Paolantoni (ARG)
7 August 2019; 16:30	1× (yellow card) 4× (suspension) 1× (red card)	Report	1× (yellow card) 5× (suspension)	Boris Trajkovski Sports Center, Skopje; Attendance: 50; Referees: García, Paolantoni (ARG)

7 August 2019; 18:30	Brazil	26–30	Iceland	Boris Trajkovski Sports Center, Skopje; Attendance: 50; Referees: Bíró, Kiss (HUN)
7 August 2019; 18:30	Braga 10	(17–22)	Óskarsson 6	Boris Trajkovski Sports Center, Skopje; Attendance: 50; Referees: Bíró, Kiss (HUN)
7 August 2019; 18:30	4× (suspension) 1× (red card)	Report	2× (suspension)	Boris Trajkovski Sports Center, Skopje; Attendance: 50; Referees: Bíró, Kiss (HUN)

7 August 2019; 20:30	Portugal	22–21	Serbia	Boris Trajkovski Sports Center, Skopje; Attendance: 100; Referees: Koo, Lee (KOR)
7 August 2019; 20:30	Salvador 7	(7–11)	Radović 6	Boris Trajkovski Sports Center, Skopje; Attendance: 100; Referees: Koo, Lee (KOR)
7 August 2019; 20:30	2× (yellow card) 4× (suspension)	Report	2× (yellow card) 4× (suspension)	Boris Trajkovski Sports Center, Skopje; Attendance: 100; Referees: Koo, Lee (KOR)

9 August 2019; 10:30	Iceland	24–28	Portugal	Boris Trajkovski Sports Center, Skopje; Attendance: 100; Referees: Carmaux, Mursch (FRA)
9 August 2019; 10:30	Þrastarson 9	(10–15)	Neves 6	Boris Trajkovski Sports Center, Skopje; Attendance: 100; Referees: Carmaux, Mursch (FRA)
9 August 2019; 10:30	2× (suspension)	Report	3× (suspension)	Boris Trajkovski Sports Center, Skopje; Attendance: 100; Referees: Carmaux, Mursch (FRA)

9 August 2019; 12:30	Germany	30–22	Serbia	Boris Trajkovski Sports Center, Skopje; Attendance: 100; Referees: Bíró, Kiss (HUN)
9 August 2019; 12:30	Fuss 6	(16–11)	three players 4	Boris Trajkovski Sports Center, Skopje; Attendance: 100; Referees: Bíró, Kiss (HUN)
9 August 2019; 12:30	2× (yellow card) 6× (suspension) 1× (red card)	Report	1× (yellow card) 3× (suspension)	Boris Trajkovski Sports Center, Skopje; Attendance: 100; Referees: Bíró, Kiss (HUN)

9 August 2019; 14:30	Tunisia	26–25	Brazil	Boris Trajkovski Sports Center, Skopje; Attendance: 50; Referees: Doychinov, Goretsov (BUL)
9 August 2019; 14:30	Saïdi 12	(13–16)	Freitas 7	Boris Trajkovski Sports Center, Skopje; Attendance: 50; Referees: Doychinov, Goretsov (BUL)
9 August 2019; 14:30	5× (suspension)	Report	1× (suspension) 1× (red card)	Boris Trajkovski Sports Center, Skopje; Attendance: 50; Referees: Doychinov, Goretsov (BUL)

10 August 2019; 16:30	Germany	28–22	Brazil	Boris Trajkovski Sports Center, Skopje; Attendance: 50; Referees: Covalciuc, Covalciuc (MDA)
10 August 2019; 16:30	three players 4	(13–11)	Braga 5	Boris Trajkovski Sports Center, Skopje; Attendance: 50; Referees: Covalciuc, Covalciuc (MDA)
10 August 2019; 16:30	1× (yellow card) 3× (suspension)	Report	1× (yellow card) 4× (suspension)	Boris Trajkovski Sports Center, Skopje; Attendance: 50; Referees: Covalciuc, Covalciuc (MDA)

10 August 2019; 18:30	Serbia	22–26	Iceland	Boris Trajkovski Sports Center, Skopje; Attendance: 100; Referees: Bolic, Hurich (AUT)
10 August 2019; 18:30	Milićević 7	(9–13)	Valencia 6	Boris Trajkovski Sports Center, Skopje; Attendance: 100; Referees: Bolic, Hurich (AUT)
10 August 2019; 18:30	4× (suspension) 1× (red card)	Report	1× (yellow card) 5× (suspension) 2× (red card)	Boris Trajkovski Sports Center, Skopje; Attendance: 100; Referees: Bolic, Hurich (AUT)

10 August 2019; 20:30	Portugal	30–24	Tunisia	Boris Trajkovski Sports Center, Skopje; Attendance: 100; Referees: Hussein, Imran (IRQ)
10 August 2019; 20:30	Sousa 8	(16–10)	Ben Slimen 6	Boris Trajkovski Sports Center, Skopje; Attendance: 100; Referees: Hussein, Imran (IRQ)
10 August 2019; 20:30	4× (suspension)	Report	2× (yellow card) 1× (suspension)	Boris Trajkovski Sports Center, Skopje; Attendance: 100; Referees: Hussein, Imran (IRQ)

12 August 2019; 10:30	Brazil	29–36	Portugal	Boris Trajkovski Sports Center, Skopje; Attendance: 50; Referees: Emam, Hedaia (EGY)
12 August 2019; 10:30	Freitas 7	(14–19)	Ribeiro 9	Boris Trajkovski Sports Center, Skopje; Attendance: 50; Referees: Emam, Hedaia (EGY)
12 August 2019; 10:30	2× (suspension)	Report	1× (yellow card) 6× (suspension)	Boris Trajkovski Sports Center, Skopje; Attendance: 50; Referees: Emam, Hedaia (EGY)

12 August 2019; 12:30	Serbia	23–25	Tunisia	Boris Trajkovski Sports Center, Skopje; Attendance: 100; Referees: García, Paolantoni (ARG)
12 August 2019; 12:30	Radović 7	(13–12)	Saïdi 8	Boris Trajkovski Sports Center, Skopje; Attendance: 100; Referees: García, Paolantoni (ARG)
12 August 2019; 12:30	1× (yellow card) 3× (suspension)	Report	1× (yellow card) 6× (suspension) 1× (red card)	Boris Trajkovski Sports Center, Skopje; Attendance: 100; Referees: García, Paolantoni (ARG)

12 August 2019; 14:30	Iceland	22–26	Germany	Boris Trajkovski Sports Center, Skopje; Attendance: 100; Referees: Carmaux, Mursch (FRA)
12 August 2019; 14:30	Gatuason 4	(9–13)	Bergner 6	Boris Trajkovski Sports Center, Skopje; Attendance: 100; Referees: Carmaux, Mursch (FRA)
12 August 2019; 14:30	1× (yellow card) 3× (suspension)	Report	4× (suspension)	Boris Trajkovski Sports Center, Skopje; Attendance: 100; Referees: Carmaux, Mursch (FRA)

== President's Cup ==
17th place bracket

17th–20th place semifinals
14 August
Saudi Arabia	23
Chinese Taipei	28
14 August
Bahrain	34
Serbia	33

17th place
15 August
Chinese Taipei	22
Bahrain	26
19th place
15 August
Saudi Arabia	23
Serbia	28

21st place bracket

21st–24th place semifinals
14 August
Chile	46
Canada	24
14 August
Nigeria	23
Brazil	30

21st place
15 August
Chile	22
Brazil	30
23rd place
15 August
Canada	31
Nigeria	37

=== 21st–24th place semifinals ===
14 August 2019; 09:30	Chile	46–24	Canada	Jane Sandanski Arena, Skopje; Attendance: 100; Referees: Al-Zayyat, Eialawad (JOR)
14 August 2019; 09:30	Aedo 9	(21–10)	Gaspard 5	Jane Sandanski Arena, Skopje; Attendance: 100; Referees: Al-Zayyat, Eialawad (JOR)
14 August 2019; 09:30	1× (yellow card) 6× (suspension)	Report	2× (suspension) 1× (red card)	Jane Sandanski Arena, Skopje; Attendance: 100; Referees: Al-Zayyat, Eialawad (JOR)

14 August 2019; 09:30	Nigeria	23–30	Brazil	Boris Trajkovski Sports Center, Skopje; Attendance: 50; Referees: Diop, Faye (SEN)
14 August 2019; 09:30	Gbawuan, Sani 5	(14–14)	Luciano 7	Boris Trajkovski Sports Center, Skopje; Attendance: 50; Referees: Diop, Faye (SEN)
14 August 2019; 09:30	5× (suspension)	Report	1× (yellow card) 4× (suspension)	Boris Trajkovski Sports Center, Skopje; Attendance: 50; Referees: Diop, Faye (SEN)

=== 17th–20th place semifinals ===
14 August 2019; 11:45	Saudi Arabia	23–28	Chinese Taipei	Jane Sandanski Arena, Skopje; Attendance: 100; Referees: Hussein, Imran (IRQ)
14 August 2019; 11:45	Qaesar 6	(9–11)	Hsu Y. 8	Jane Sandanski Arena, Skopje; Attendance: 100; Referees: Hussein, Imran (IRQ)
14 August 2019; 11:45	1× (yellow card) 7× (suspension)	Report	1× (yellow card) 6× (suspension)	Jane Sandanski Arena, Skopje; Attendance: 100; Referees: Hussein, Imran (IRQ)

14 August 2019; 11:45	Bahrain	34–33	Serbia	Boris Trajkovski Sports Center, Skopje; Attendance: 50; Referees: Doychinov, Goretsov (BUL)
14 August 2019; 11:45	Mohamed 10	(20–14)	Mićić 9	Boris Trajkovski Sports Center, Skopje; Attendance: 50; Referees: Doychinov, Goretsov (BUL)
14 August 2019; 11:45	1× (yellow card) 1× (suspension)	Report	2× (yellow card) 5× (suspension)	Boris Trajkovski Sports Center, Skopje; Attendance: 50; Referees: Doychinov, Goretsov (BUL)

=== 23rd place game ===
15 August 2019; 09:30	Canada	31–37	Nigeria	Boris Trajkovski Sports Center, Skopje; Attendance: 50; Referees: Al-Wattani, Qamber (BHR)
15 August 2019; 09:30	Gasparad 7	(17–19)	three players 6	Boris Trajkovski Sports Center, Skopje; Attendance: 50; Referees: Al-Wattani, Qamber (BHR)
15 August 2019; 09:30	1× (yellow card) 6× (suspension)	Report	2× (yellow card) 2× (suspension) 1× (red card)	Boris Trajkovski Sports Center, Skopje; Attendance: 50; Referees: Al-Wattani, Qamber (BHR)

=== 21st place game ===
15 August 2019; 11:45	Chile	22–30	Brazil	Boris Trajkovski Sports Center, Skopje; Attendance: 50; Referees: Emam, Hedaia (EGY)
15 August 2019; 11:45	Paya 6	(13–14)	Luciano 8	Boris Trajkovski Sports Center, Skopje; Attendance: 50; Referees: Emam, Hedaia (EGY)
15 August 2019; 11:45	1× (yellow card) 3× (suspension)	Report	2× (yellow card) 8× (suspension)	Boris Trajkovski Sports Center, Skopje; Attendance: 50; Referees: Emam, Hedaia (EGY)

=== 19th place game ===
15 August 2019; 09:30	Saudi Arabia	23–28	Serbia	Jane Sandanski Arena, Skopje; Referees: Al-Zayyat, Eialawad (JOR)
15 August 2019; 09:30	Hassan 7	(14–12)	Kojadinović 8	Jane Sandanski Arena, Skopje; Referees: Al-Zayyat, Eialawad (JOR)
15 August 2019; 09:30	4× (suspension)	Report	1× (yellow card) 6× (suspension)	Jane Sandanski Arena, Skopje; Referees: Al-Zayyat, Eialawad (JOR)

=== 17th place game ===
15 August 2019; 11:45	Chinese Taipei	22–26	Bahrain	Jane Sandanski Arena, Skopje; Referees: García, Paolantoni (ARG)
15 August 2019; 11:45	Tsai 6	(12–11)	Mohamed 8	Jane Sandanski Arena, Skopje; Referees: García, Paolantoni (ARG)
15 August 2019; 11:45	1× (yellow card) 3× (suspension)	Report	3× (yellow card) 6× (suspension)	Jane Sandanski Arena, Skopje; Referees: García, Paolantoni (ARG)

== 9–16th placement games ==
The eight losers of the round of 16 were seeded according to their results in the preliminary round against teams ranked 1–4 and play an elimination game to determine their final position.

=== Standings ===
Pos	Team	Pld	W	D	L	GF	GA	GD	Pts
1	Croatia	3	3	0	0	89	65	+24	6
2	Japan	3	2	0	1	83	78	+5	4
3	Norway	3	1	1	1	84	85	−1	3
4	Sweden	3	1	1	1	90	92	−2	3
5	Argentina	3	1	0	2	68	78	−10	2
6	North Macedonia	3	0	0	3	68	83	−15	0
7	Slovenia	3	0	0	3	67	89	−22	0
8	Tunisia	3	0	0	3	59	91	−32	0

Rules for classification: 1) points; 2) goal difference; 3) number of goals scored.

=== 15th place game ===
15 August 2019; 14:00	Slovenia	34–23	Tunisia	Boris Trajkovski Sports Center, Skopje; Attendance: 100; Referees: Doychinov, Goretsov (BUL)
15 August 2019; 14:00	Mustafić, Tajnik 7	(20–11)	Saïdi 5	Boris Trajkovski Sports Center, Skopje; Attendance: 100; Referees: Doychinov, Goretsov (BUL)
15 August 2019; 14:00	2× (suspension)	Report	2× (yellow card) 8× (suspension) 2× (red card)	Boris Trajkovski Sports Center, Skopje; Attendance: 100; Referees: Doychinov, Goretsov (BUL)

=== 13th place game ===
15 August 2019; 16:15	Argentina	26–29	North Macedonia	Boris Trajkovski Sports Center, Skopje; Attendance: 300; Referees: Koo, Lee (KOR)
15 August 2019; 16:15	Fillol 5	(8–15)	Simonoski 9	Boris Trajkovski Sports Center, Skopje; Attendance: 300; Referees: Koo, Lee (KOR)
15 August 2019; 16:15	3× (suspension)	Report	1× (yellow card) 4× (suspension)	Boris Trajkovski Sports Center, Skopje; Attendance: 300; Referees: Koo, Lee (KOR)

=== Eleventh place game ===
15 August 2019; 14:00	Norway	24–30	Sweden	Jane Sandanski Arena, Skopje; Referees: Bolic, Hurich (AUT)
15 August 2019; 14:00	Norberg 6	(13–16)	Wallin 6	Jane Sandanski Arena, Skopje; Referees: Bolic, Hurich (AUT)
15 August 2019; 14:00	1× (yellow card) 2× (suspension)	Report	1× (yellow card) 3× (suspension)	Jane Sandanski Arena, Skopje; Referees: Bolic, Hurich (AUT)

=== Ninth place game ===
15 August 2019
16:15
Croatia
35–36
Japan
Jane Sandanski Arena, Skopje
Referees: Reyes, Zuñiga (CUB)
Mileta 6
(15–18)
Yasuhira 9
3× (suspension)
Report
1× (yellow card) 3× (suspension)

FT: 30–30 Pen: 5–6

== Knockout stage ==
=== Bracket ===
Round of 16
14 August
Egypt	30
Slovenia	23
14 August
Iceland	39
Japan	34
14 August
France	33
Norway	28
14 August
Portugal	29
North Macedonia	25
14 August
Croatia	23
Hungary	27
14 August
Argentina	25
Germany	33
14 August
Spain	28
Sweden	27
14 August
Denmark	30
Tunisia	25

Quarterfinals
15 August
Egypt	35
Iceland	31
15 August
France	26
Portugal	31
15 August
Hungary	16
Germany	26
15 August
Spain	19
Denmark	23

Semifinals
17 August
Egypt	41
Portugal	36
17 August
Germany	31
Denmark	23

Final
18 August
Egypt	32
Germany	28
Third place
18 August
Portugal	27
Denmark	35

5th place bracket

5th–8th place Semifinals
17 August
Iceland	24
France	30
17 August
Hungary	29
Spain	24

Fifth place
18 August
France	20
Hungary	31
Seventh place
18 August
Iceland	26
Spain	30

=== Round of 16 ===
14 August 2019; 14:00	Egypt	30–23	Slovenia	Jane Sandanski Arena, Skopje; Attendance: 100; Referees: Merz, Schilha (GER)
14 August 2019; 14:00	Walid 6	(16–8)	Šiško 5	Jane Sandanski Arena, Skopje; Attendance: 100; Referees: Merz, Schilha (GER)
14 August 2019; 14:00	1× (yellow card) 3× (suspension)	Report	2× (yellow card) 5× (suspension)	Jane Sandanski Arena, Skopje; Attendance: 100; Referees: Merz, Schilha (GER)

14 August 2019; 14:00	Argentina	25–33	Germany	Boris Trajkovski Sports Center, Skopje; Referees: Reyes, Zuñiga (CUB)
14 August 2019; 14:00	J. Barcelo, Vitaller 5	(15–16)	Fuß, Mävers 6	Boris Trajkovski Sports Center, Skopje; Referees: Reyes, Zuñiga (CUB)
14 August 2019; 14:00	1× (yellow card) 5× (suspension)	Report	2× (yellow card) 6× (suspension)	Boris Trajkovski Sports Center, Skopje; Referees: Reyes, Zuñiga (CUB)

14 August 2019; 16:15	Croatia	23–27	Hungary	Jane Sandanski Arena, Skopje; Attendance: 120; Referees: Jovandić, Sekulić (SRB)
14 August 2019; 16:15	Pribetić 6	(12–13)	Vajda 6	Jane Sandanski Arena, Skopje; Attendance: 120; Referees: Jovandić, Sekulić (SRB)
14 August 2019; 16:15	1× (yellow card) 5× (suspension)	Report	1× (yellow card) 4× (suspension)	Jane Sandanski Arena, Skopje; Attendance: 120; Referees: Jovandić, Sekulić (SRB)

14 August 2019; 16:15	Iceland	39–34	Japan	Boris Trajkovski Sports Center, Skopje; Attendance: 200; Referees: Emam, Hedaia (EGY)
14 August 2019; 16:15	Rúnarsson 10	(16–13)	Tsutaya 9	Boris Trajkovski Sports Center, Skopje; Attendance: 200; Referees: Emam, Hedaia (EGY)
14 August 2019; 16:15	2× (yellow card) 7× (suspension)	Report	1× (yellow card) 3× (suspension)	Boris Trajkovski Sports Center, Skopje; Attendance: 200; Referees: Emam, Hedaia (EGY)

14 August 2019; 18:30	France	33–28	Norway	Jane Sandanski Arena, Skopje; Attendance: 150; Referees: Covalciuc, Covalciuc (MDA)
14 August 2019; 18:30	Ntanzi, Tissot 7	(16–14)	Helsinghof, Lyse 7	Jane Sandanski Arena, Skopje; Attendance: 150; Referees: Covalciuc, Covalciuc (MDA)
14 August 2019; 18:30	3× (suspension)	Report	1× (yellow card) 5× (suspension)	Jane Sandanski Arena, Skopje; Attendance: 150; Referees: Covalciuc, Covalciuc (MDA)

14 August 2019; 18:30	Denmark	30–25	Tunisia	Boris Trajkovski Sports Center, Skopje; Attendance: 200; Referees: Bolic, Hurich (AUT)
14 August 2019; 18:30	Hoxer Hangaard 7	(19–12)	Saïdi 10	Boris Trajkovski Sports Center, Skopje; Attendance: 200; Referees: Bolic, Hurich (AUT)
14 August 2019; 18:30	4× (suspension)	Report	2× (yellow card) 4× (suspension)	Boris Trajkovski Sports Center, Skopje; Attendance: 200; Referees: Bolic, Hurich (AUT)

14 August 2019; 20:45	Spain	28–27	Sweden	Jane Sandanski Arena, Skopje; Referees: Koo, Lee (KOR)
14 August 2019; 20:45	Ala Sánchez, García Sánchez 5	(16–18)	Persson, Ubelacker 6	Jane Sandanski Arena, Skopje; Referees: Koo, Lee (KOR)
14 August 2019; 20:45	1× (yellow card) 2× (suspension)	Report	3× (yellow card) 4× (suspension)	Jane Sandanski Arena, Skopje; Referees: Koo, Lee (KOR)

14 August 2019; 20:45	Portugal	29–25	North Macedonia	Boris Trajkovski Sports Center, Skopje; Attendance: 3,000; Referees: García, Paolantoni (ARG)
14 August 2019; 20:45	Morais 6	(15–12)	Serafimov 9	Boris Trajkovski Sports Center, Skopje; Attendance: 3,000; Referees: García, Paolantoni (ARG)
14 August 2019; 20:45	4× (suspension)	Report	3× (yellow card) 3× (suspension)	Boris Trajkovski Sports Center, Skopje; Attendance: 3,000; Referees: García, Paolantoni (ARG)

=== Quarterfinals ===
15 August 2019; 18:30	Egypt	35–31	Iceland	Jane Sandanski Arena, Skopje; Attendance: 100; Referees: Bíró, Kiss (HUN)
15 August 2019; 18:30	three players 7	(21–14)	Rúnarsson, Þrastarson 8	Jane Sandanski Arena, Skopje; Attendance: 100; Referees: Bíró, Kiss (HUN)
15 August 2019; 18:30	2× (yellow card) 3× (suspension) 1× (red card)	Report	2× (yellow card) 2× (suspension)	Jane Sandanski Arena, Skopje; Attendance: 100; Referees: Bíró, Kiss (HUN)

15 August 2019; 18:30	Germany	26–16	Hungary	Boris Trajkovski Sports Center, Skopje; Attendance: 100; Referees: Covalciuc, Covalciuc (MDA)
15 August 2019; 18:30	Köster 6	(14–7)	Bognár 5	Boris Trajkovski Sports Center, Skopje; Attendance: 100; Referees: Covalciuc, Covalciuc (MDA)
15 August 2019; 18:30	1× (yellow card) 7× (suspension) 1× (red card)	Report	2× (yellow card) 4× (suspension)	Boris Trajkovski Sports Center, Skopje; Attendance: 100; Referees: Covalciuc, Covalciuc (MDA)

15 August 2019; 20:45	France	26–31	Portugal	Jane Sandanski Arena, Skopje; Attendance: 100; Referees: Merz, Schilha (GER)
15 August 2019; 20:45	three players 5	(10–14)	Costa 11	Jane Sandanski Arena, Skopje; Attendance: 100; Referees: Merz, Schilha (GER)
15 August 2019; 20:45	3× (suspension)	Report	2× (suspension)	Jane Sandanski Arena, Skopje; Attendance: 100; Referees: Merz, Schilha (GER)

15 August 2019; 20:45	Spain	19–23	Denmark	Boris Trajkovski Sports Center, Skopje; Attendance: 150; Referees: Carmaux, Mursch (FRA)
15 August 2019; 20:45	Martínez 4	(10–9)	Reinholdt 5	Boris Trajkovski Sports Center, Skopje; Attendance: 150; Referees: Carmaux, Mursch (FRA)
15 August 2019; 20:45	1× (yellow card) 3× (suspension)	Report	2× (suspension)	Boris Trajkovski Sports Center, Skopje; Attendance: 150; Referees: Carmaux, Mursch (FRA)

=== 5th–8th place semifinals ===
17 August 2019; 10:30	Iceland	24–30	France	Boris Trajkovski Sports Center, Skopje; Attendance: 120; Referees: Reyes, Zuñiga (CUB)
17 August 2019; 10:30	Gautason 8	(10–16)	Ntanzi 7	Boris Trajkovski Sports Center, Skopje; Attendance: 120; Referees: Reyes, Zuñiga (CUB)
17 August 2019; 10:30	2× (yellow card) 6× (suspension)	Report	1× (yellow card) 3× (suspension)	Boris Trajkovski Sports Center, Skopje; Attendance: 120; Referees: Reyes, Zuñiga (CUB)

17 August 2019; 13:00	Hungary	29–24	Spain	Boris Trajkovski Sports Center, Skopje; Referees: Covalciuc, Covalciuc (MDA)
17 August 2019; 13:00	Holdosi, Hornyák 6	(13–8)	Fernández 7	Boris Trajkovski Sports Center, Skopje; Referees: Covalciuc, Covalciuc (MDA)
17 August 2019; 13:00	1× (yellow card) 3× (suspension)	Report	1× (yellow card) 3× (suspension)	Boris Trajkovski Sports Center, Skopje; Referees: Covalciuc, Covalciuc (MDA)

=== Semifinals ===
17 August 2019; 17:30	Egypt	41–36	Portugal	Boris Trajkovski Sports Center, Skopje; Attendance: 1,000; Referees: Carmaux, Mursch (FRA)
17 August 2019; 17:30	Hesham 11	(20–19)	Salvador 9	Boris Trajkovski Sports Center, Skopje; Attendance: 1,000; Referees: Carmaux, Mursch (FRA)
17 August 2019; 17:30	3× (suspension)	Report	1× (yellow card) 3× (suspension)	Boris Trajkovski Sports Center, Skopje; Attendance: 1,000; Referees: Carmaux, Mursch (FRA)

17 August 2019; 20:00	Germany	31–23	Denmark	Boris Trajkovski Sports Center, Skopje; Attendance: 1,500; Referees: Jovandić, Sekulić (SRB)
17 August 2019; 20:00	Reimann 5	(13–9)	Hoxer Hangaard 6	Boris Trajkovski Sports Center, Skopje; Attendance: 1,500; Referees: Jovandić, Sekulić (SRB)
17 August 2019; 20:00	1× (yellow card) 4× (suspension)	Report	2× (suspension)	Boris Trajkovski Sports Center, Skopje; Attendance: 1,500; Referees: Jovandić, Sekulić (SRB)

=== Seventh place game ===
18 August 2019; 10:30	Iceland	26–30	Spain	Boris Trajkovski Sports Center, Skopje; Attendance: 100; Referees: Koo, Lee (KOR)
18 August 2019; 10:30	Gautason, Oskarsson 5	(8–12)	Sánchez 5	Boris Trajkovski Sports Center, Skopje; Attendance: 100; Referees: Koo, Lee (KOR)
18 August 2019; 10:30	2× (yellow card) 2× (suspension)	Report	2× (yellow card) 5× (suspension)	Boris Trajkovski Sports Center, Skopje; Attendance: 100; Referees: Koo, Lee (KOR)

=== Fifth place game ===
18 August 2019; 13:00	France	20–31	Hungary	Boris Trajkovski Sports Center, Skopje; Referees: García, Paolantoni (ARG)
18 August 2019; 13:00	three players 3	(9–18)	Kecskés 6	Boris Trajkovski Sports Center, Skopje; Referees: García, Paolantoni (ARG)
18 August 2019; 13:00	4× (suspension)	Report	1× (yellow card) 1× (suspension)	Boris Trajkovski Sports Center, Skopje; Referees: García, Paolantoni (ARG)

=== Third place game ===
18 August 2019; 15:30	Portugal	27–35	Denmark	Boris Trajkovski Sports Center, Skopje; Attendance: 200; Referees: Merz, Schilha (GER)
18 August 2019; 15:30	Salvador, Sousa 4	(11–15)	Hoxer Hangaard 10	Boris Trajkovski Sports Center, Skopje; Attendance: 200; Referees: Merz, Schilha (GER)
18 August 2019; 15:30	3× (suspension)	Report	3× (suspension) 1× (red card)	Boris Trajkovski Sports Center, Skopje; Attendance: 200; Referees: Merz, Schilha (GER)

=== Final ===
18 August 2019; 18:00	Egypt	32–28	Germany	Boris Trajkovski Sports Center, Skopje; Attendance: 2,000; Referees: Bíró, Kiss (HUN)
18 August 2019; 18:00	Hesham, Walid 8	(19–13)	Meddeb 7	Boris Trajkovski Sports Center, Skopje; Attendance: 2,000; Referees: Bíró, Kiss (HUN)
18 August 2019; 18:00	3× (suspension)	Report	2× (yellow card) 5× (suspension)	Boris Trajkovski Sports Center, Skopje; Attendance: 2,000; Referees: Bíró, Kiss (HUN)

== Final ranking ==
Rank	Team
Gold medal	Egypt
Silver medal	Germany
Bronze medal	Denmark
4	Portugal
5	Hungary
6	France
7	Spain
8	Iceland
9	Japan
10	Croatia
11	Sweden
12	Norway
13	North Macedonia
14	Argentina
15	Slovenia
16	Tunisia
17	Bahrain
18	Chinese Taipei
19	Serbia
20	Saudi Arabia
21	Brazil
22	Chile
23	Nigeria
24	Canada

== Statistics ==
=== Top goalscorers ===
Rank	Name	Team	Goals	Shots	%
1	Hassan Walid	Egypt	51	81	63
2	Mohamed Mohamed	Bahrain	49	73	67
2	Martin Serafimov	North Macedonia	49	92	57
4	Ahmed Hesham	Egypt	48	76	63
5	Nenad Kosteski	North Macedonia	46	63	73
6	Jeppe Cieslak	Denmark	45	59	76
6	Salvador Salvador	Portugal	45	75	60
8	Dagur Gautason	Iceland	44	60	73
9	Drevy Paschal	France	43	62	61
9	Sadou Ntanzi	France	43	70	69

Source: IHF

=== Top goalkeepers ===
Rank	Name	Team	%	Saves	Shots
1	Benedek Nagy	Hungary	40	42	106
2	Lukas Diedrich	Germany	38	50	130
3	Stipe Purić	Croatia	36	60	165
4	Charles Bolzinger	France	36	46	129
5	Svend Rughave	Denmark	36	74	208
6	Roberto Rodríguez	Spain	34	81	236
7	Kristóf Győri	Hungary	34	71	207
8	Nikola Ćirović	Serbia	34	58	170
9	Darko Stošić	Serbia	34	22	65
10	Abdelrahman Mohamed	Egypt	33	87	260

Source: IHF

== Awards ==
The MVP and all-star team were announced on 18 August 2019.

MVP

- (Egypt) Ahmed Hesham

Best defender

- (Germany) Julian Köster

All-star team

- Goalkeeper: (Egypt) Abdelrahman Mohamed
- Right wing: (Hungary) Dániel Kecskés
- Right back: (Portugal) Martim Costa
- Centre back: (Denmark) Lauritz Reinholdt
- Left back: (Egypt) Hassan Walid
- Left wing: (Germany) Alexander Reimann
- Pivot: (Germany) Tom Bergner
