= 2018 European Men's U-18 Handball Championship =

Tournament details
- Host country: Croatia
- Venue(s): 2 (in 2 host cities)
- Dates: 9–19 August 2018
- Teams: 16 (from 1 confederation)

Final positions
- Champions: Sweden (2nd title)
- Runners-up: Iceland
- Third place: Denmark
- Fourth place: Croatia

Tournament statistics
- Matches played: 56
- Goals scored: 2,925 (52.23 per match)
- Attendance: 12,699 (227 per match)
- Top scorer(s): (Sweden) Ludvig Hallbäck (56 goals)

Awards
- Best player: (Iceland) Haukur Þrastarson

The 2018 European Men's U-18 Handball Championship was the fourteenth edition of the European Men's U-18 Handball Championship, held in Varaždin and Koprivnica, Croatia from 9 to 19 August 2018.

== Qualified teams ==
- Croatia
- Denmark
- France
- Germany
- Hungary
- Iceland
- Israel
- Norway
- Poland
- Portugal
- Romania
- Russia
- Serbia
- Slovenia
- Spain
- Sweden

== Draw ==
The draw was held on 25 January 2018 in Zagreb.

Pot 1	Pot 2	Pot 3	Pot 4
France; Germany; Croatia; Slovenia	Denmark; Spain; Iceland; Serbia	Sweden; Portugal; Russia; Norway	Poland; Hungary; Israel; Romania

== Preliminary round ==
All times are local (UTC+2).

=== Group A ===
Pos	Team	Pld	W	D	L	GF	GA	GD	Pts	Qualification
1	Croatia (H)	3	3	0	0	94	68	+26	6	Main round
2	Serbia	3	1	1	1	70	73	−3	3	Main round
3	Portugal	3	1	0	2	71	86	−15	2	Intermediate round
4	Israel	3	0	1	2	76	84	−8	1	Intermediate round

Source: EHF
Rules for classification: 1) points; 2) head-to-head points; 3) head-to-head goal difference; 4) head-to-head number of goals scored; 5) Goal difference.
(H) Hosts

9 August 2018; 18:30	Serbia	25–25	Israel	Sport Hall Fran Galović, Koprivnica; Attendance: 78; Referees: Bíró, Kiss (HUN)
9 August 2018; 18:30	Kojadinović 7	(10–13)	Amiel 6	Sport Hall Fran Galović, Koprivnica; Attendance: 78; Referees: Bíró, Kiss (HUN)
9 August 2018; 18:30	3× (yellow card) 7× (suspension)	Report	3× (yellow card) 7× (suspension) 1× (red card)	Sport Hall Fran Galović, Koprivnica; Attendance: 78; Referees: Bíró, Kiss (HUN)

9 August 2018; 20:30	Croatia	37–21	Portugal	Sport Hall Fran Galović, Koprivnica; Attendance: 300; Referees: Mertinian, Syrepisios (GRE)
9 August 2018; 20:30	Maraš 9	(15–11)	Neves 7	Sport Hall Fran Galović, Koprivnica; Attendance: 300; Referees: Mertinian, Syrepisios (GRE)
9 August 2018; 20:30	3× (yellow card) 6× (suspension)	Report	3× (yellow card) 6× (suspension)	Sport Hall Fran Galović, Koprivnica; Attendance: 300; Referees: Mertinian, Syrepisios (GRE)

10 August 2018; 18:30	Portugal	21–25	Serbia	Sport Hall Fran Galović, Koprivnica; Attendance: 150; Referees: Ershov, Pavliukov (RUS)
10 August 2018; 18:30	M. Costa 7	(7–11)	Nikolić 10	Sport Hall Fran Galović, Koprivnica; Attendance: 150; Referees: Ershov, Pavliukov (RUS)
10 August 2018; 18:30	2× (yellow card) 4× (suspension) 1× (red card)	Report	3× (yellow card) 6× (suspension) 1× (red card)	Sport Hall Fran Galović, Koprivnica; Attendance: 150; Referees: Ershov, Pavliukov (RUS)

10 August 2018; 20:30	Israel	27–30	Croatia	Sport Hall Fran Galović, Koprivnica; Attendance: 528; Referees: Jović, Arnautović (BIH)
10 August 2018; 20:30	Lumbroso 7	(15–15)	Maraš 7	Sport Hall Fran Galović, Koprivnica; Attendance: 528; Referees: Jović, Arnautović (BIH)
10 August 2018; 20:30	4× (yellow card) 5× (suspension)	Report	3× (yellow card) 4× (suspension) 1× (red card)	Sport Hall Fran Galović, Koprivnica; Attendance: 528; Referees: Jović, Arnautović (BIH)

12 August 2018; 18:30	Portugal	29–24	Israel	Sport Hall Fran Galović, Koprivnica; Attendance: 269; Referees: Budzák, Záhradník (SVK)
12 August 2018; 18:30	M. Costa, Morais 6	(15–14)	Lumbroso 6	Sport Hall Fran Galović, Koprivnica; Attendance: 269; Referees: Budzák, Záhradník (SVK)
12 August 2018; 18:30	1× (yellow card) 8× (suspension) 1× (red card)	Report	2× (yellow card) 8× (suspension) 3× (red card)	Sport Hall Fran Galović, Koprivnica; Attendance: 269; Referees: Budzák, Záhradník (SVK)

12 August 2018; 20:30	Croatia	27–20	Serbia	Sport Hall Fran Galović, Koprivnica; Attendance: 650; Referees: Bíró, Kiss (HUN)
12 August 2018; 20:30	Mileta, Pribetić 6	(14–8)	Nikolić 5	Sport Hall Fran Galović, Koprivnica; Attendance: 650; Referees: Bíró, Kiss (HUN)
12 August 2018; 20:30	3× (yellow card) 5× (suspension)	Report	2× (yellow card) 5× (suspension)	Sport Hall Fran Galović, Koprivnica; Attendance: 650; Referees: Bíró, Kiss (HUN)

=== Group B ===
Pos	Team	Pld	W	D	L	GF	GA	GD	Pts	Qualification
1	Denmark	3	3	0	0	78	67	+11	6	Main round
2	France	3	1	1	1	81	83	−2	3	Main round
3	Norway	3	1	0	2	82	88	−6	2	Intermediate round
4	Romania	3	0	1	2	80	83	−3	1	Intermediate round

Source: EHF
Rules for classification: 1) points; 2) head-to-head points; 3) head-to-head goal difference; 4) head-to-head number of goals scored; 5) Goal difference.

9 August 2018; 14:30	France	30–29	Norway	Sport Hall Fran Galović, Koprivnica; Attendance: 89; Referees: Ershov, Pavliukov (RUS)
9 August 2018; 14:30	N'Tanzi 7	(14–14)	Petersen Norberg 6	Sport Hall Fran Galović, Koprivnica; Attendance: 89; Referees: Ershov, Pavliukov (RUS)
9 August 2018; 14:30	3× (yellow card) 7× (suspension)	Report	1× (yellow card) 6× (suspension)	Sport Hall Fran Galović, Koprivnica; Attendance: 89; Referees: Ershov, Pavliukov (RUS)

9 August 2018; 16:30	Denmark	24–22	Romania	Sport Hall Fran Galović, Koprivnica; Attendance: 100; Referees: Jović, Arnautović (BIH)
9 August 2018; 16:30	Rasmussen 4	(13–12)	Brăescu 4	Sport Hall Fran Galović, Koprivnica; Attendance: 100; Referees: Jović, Arnautović (BIH)
9 August 2018; 16:30	3× (yellow card) 5× (suspension) 1× (red card)	Report	3× (yellow card) 4× (suspension)	Sport Hall Fran Galović, Koprivnica; Attendance: 100; Referees: Jović, Arnautović (BIH)

10 August 2018; 14:30	Romania	30–30	France	Sport Hall Fran Galović, Koprivnica; Attendance: 100; Referees: Mertinian, Syrepisios (GRE)
10 August 2018; 14:30	Bugulet, Neagu 5	(10–15)	N'Tanzi 9	Sport Hall Fran Galović, Koprivnica; Attendance: 100; Referees: Mertinian, Syrepisios (GRE)
10 August 2018; 14:30	3× (yellow card) 3× (suspension)	Report	3× (yellow card) 4× (suspension)	Sport Hall Fran Galović, Koprivnica; Attendance: 100; Referees: Mertinian, Syrepisios (GRE)

10 August 2018; 16:30	Norway	24–30	Denmark	Sport Hall Fran Galović, Koprivnica; Attendance: 111; Referees: Bíró, Kiss (HUN)
10 August 2018; 16:30	Fiala Gjermundnes 5	(9–12)	Pytlick 9	Sport Hall Fran Galović, Koprivnica; Attendance: 111; Referees: Bíró, Kiss (HUN)
10 August 2018; 16:30	4× (yellow card) 3× (suspension)	Report	2× (yellow card) 1× (suspension)	Sport Hall Fran Galović, Koprivnica; Attendance: 111; Referees: Bíró, Kiss (HUN)

12 August 2018; 14:30	France	21–24	Denmark	Sport Hall Fran Galović, Koprivnica; Attendance: 105; Referees: Ershov, Pavliukov (RUS)
12 August 2018; 14:30	N'Tanzi 6	(11–12)	Cieslak 5	Sport Hall Fran Galović, Koprivnica; Attendance: 105; Referees: Ershov, Pavliukov (RUS)
12 August 2018; 14:30	3× (yellow card) 3× (suspension)	Report	2× (yellow card) 2× (suspension)	Sport Hall Fran Galović, Koprivnica; Attendance: 105; Referees: Ershov, Pavliukov (RUS)

12 August 2018; 16:30	Norway	29–28	Romania	Sport Hall Fran Galović, Koprivnica; Attendance: 156; Referees: Geraets, Geraets (NED)
12 August 2018; 16:30	Blonz 5	(14–16)	Iordache 6	Sport Hall Fran Galović, Koprivnica; Attendance: 156; Referees: Geraets, Geraets (NED)
12 August 2018; 16:30	3× (yellow card) 5× (suspension)	Report	3× (yellow card) 1× (suspension)	Sport Hall Fran Galović, Koprivnica; Attendance: 156; Referees: Geraets, Geraets (NED)

=== Group C ===
Pos	Team	Pld	W	D	L	GF	GA	GD	Pts	Qualification
1	Germany	3	3	0	0	75	60	+15	6	Main round
2	Spain	3	1	0	2	73	62	+11	2 (Note: Spain 2 Pts, +14 GD; Hungary 2 Pts, +2 GD; Russia 2 Pts, –16 GD)	Main round
3	Hungary	3	1	0	2	65	74	−9	2	Intermediate round
4	Russia	3	1	0	2	61	78	−17	2	Intermediate round

Source: EHF
Rules for classification: 1) points; 2) head-to-head points; 3) head-to-head goal difference; 4) head-to-head number of goals scored; 5) Goal difference.
Notes:

9 August 2018; 18:30	Germany	21–20	Russia	Varaždin Arena, Varaždin; Attendance: 100; Referees: Boričić, Marković (SRB)
9 August 2018; 18:30	Knorr 5	(10–8)	Chan Suan 6	Varaždin Arena, Varaždin; Attendance: 100; Referees: Boričić, Marković (SRB)
9 August 2018; 18:30	2× (yellow card) 4× (suspension)	Report	3× (yellow card) 5× (suspension)	Varaždin Arena, Varaždin; Attendance: 100; Referees: Boričić, Marković (SRB)

9 August 2018; 20:30	Spain	19–22	Hungary	Varaždin Arena, Varaždin; Attendance: 200; Referees: Lončar, Lončar (CRO)
9 August 2018; 20:30	Calle 4	(10–12)	Bálint 8	Varaždin Arena, Varaždin; Attendance: 200; Referees: Lončar, Lončar (CRO)
9 August 2018; 20:30	1× (yellow card) 2× (suspension)	Report	2× (yellow card) 5× (suspension)	Varaždin Arena, Varaždin; Attendance: 200; Referees: Lončar, Lončar (CRO)

10 August 2018; 18:30	Hungary	18–29	Germany	Varaždin Arena, Varaždin; Attendance: 121; Referees: Simone, Monitillo (ITA)
10 August 2018; 18:30	Bognár 6	(10–14)	Knorr 7	Varaždin Arena, Varaždin; Attendance: 121; Referees: Simone, Monitillo (ITA)
10 August 2018; 18:30	2× (yellow card) 5× (suspension)	Report	2× (yellow card) 5× (suspension) 1× (red card)	Varaždin Arena, Varaždin; Attendance: 121; Referees: Simone, Monitillo (ITA)

10 August 2018; 20:30	Russia	15–32	Spain	Varaždin Arena, Varaždin; Attendance: 57; Referees: Budzák, Záhradník (SVK)
10 August 2018; 20:30	Chan Suan, Novokreshchenov 3	(7–11)	Diocou 5	Varaždin Arena, Varaždin; Attendance: 57; Referees: Budzák, Záhradník (SVK)
10 August 2018; 20:30	2× (yellow card) 5× (suspension)	Report	3× (yellow card) 2× (suspension)	Varaždin Arena, Varaždin; Attendance: 57; Referees: Budzák, Záhradník (SVK)

12 August 2018; 18:30	Germany	25–22	Spain	Varaždin Arena, Varaždin; Attendance: 150; Referees: Jović, Arnautović (BIH)
12 August 2018; 18:30	Knorr, Tobeler 5	(10–8)	Diocou 7	Varaždin Arena, Varaždin; Attendance: 150; Referees: Jović, Arnautović (BIH)
12 August 2018; 18:30	3× (yellow card) 4× (suspension)	Report	3× (yellow card) 3× (suspension)	Varaždin Arena, Varaždin; Attendance: 150; Referees: Jović, Arnautović (BIH)

12 August 2018; 20:30	Russia	26–25	Hungary	Varaždin Arena, Varaždin; Attendance: 100; Referees: Boričić, Marković (SRB)
12 August 2018; 20:30	Chan Suan 8	(10–14)	Bálint 6	Varaždin Arena, Varaždin; Attendance: 100; Referees: Boričić, Marković (SRB)
12 August 2018; 20:30	1× (yellow card) 4× (suspension)	Report	3× (yellow card) 7× (suspension) 1× (red card)	Varaždin Arena, Varaždin; Attendance: 100; Referees: Boričić, Marković (SRB)

=== Group D ===
Pos	Team	Pld	W	D	L	GF	GA	GD	Pts	Qualification
1	Iceland	3	3	0	0	82	68	+14	6	Main round
2	Sweden	3	2	0	1	87	80	+7	4	Main round
3	Slovenia	3	1	0	2	77	79	−2	2	Intermediate round
4	Poland	3	0	0	3	72	91	−19	0	Intermediate round

Source: EHF
Rules for classification: 1) points; 2) head-to-head points; 3) head-to-head goal difference; 4) head-to-head number of goals scored; 5) Goal difference.

9 August 2018; 14:30	Slovenia	21–29	Sweden	Varaždin Arena, Varaždin; Attendance: 250; Referees: Budzák, Záhradník (SVK)
9 August 2018; 14:30	Ćirović 6	(11–17)	Hallbäck 8	Varaždin Arena, Varaždin; Attendance: 250; Referees: Budzák, Záhradník (SVK)
9 August 2018; 14:30	3× (yellow card) 4× (suspension)	Report	2× (yellow card) 7× (suspension)	Varaždin Arena, Varaždin; Attendance: 250; Referees: Budzák, Záhradník (SVK)

9 August 2018; 16:30	Iceland	25–20	Poland	Varaždin Arena, Varaždin; Attendance: 80; Referees: Simone, Monitillo (ITA)
9 August 2018; 16:30	Gautason 9	(12–9)	Ścisłowicz 7	Varaždin Arena, Varaždin; Attendance: 80; Referees: Simone, Monitillo (ITA)
9 August 2018; 16:30	3× (yellow card) 4× (suspension)	Report	2× (yellow card) 4× (suspension)	Varaždin Arena, Varaždin; Attendance: 80; Referees: Simone, Monitillo (ITA)

10 August 2018; 14:30	Poland	22–32	Slovenia	Varaždin Arena, Varaždin; Attendance: 100; Referees: Geraets, Geraets (NED)
10 August 2018; 14:30	Ścisłowicz 6	(10–17)	Grobelnik 9	Varaždin Arena, Varaždin; Attendance: 100; Referees: Geraets, Geraets (NED)
10 August 2018; 14:30	1× (yellow card) 6× (suspension)	Report	2× (yellow card) 4× (suspension)	Varaždin Arena, Varaždin; Attendance: 100; Referees: Geraets, Geraets (NED)

10 August 2018; 16:30	Sweden	24–29	Iceland	Varaždin Arena, Varaždin; Attendance: 250; Referees: Boričić, Marković (SRB)
10 August 2018; 16:30	Johansson 6	(12–14)	Óskarsson, Þrastarson 8	Varaždin Arena, Varaždin; Attendance: 250; Referees: Boričić, Marković (SRB)
10 August 2018; 16:30	3× (yellow card) 4× (suspension)	Report	2× (yellow card) 7× (suspension)	Varaždin Arena, Varaždin; Attendance: 250; Referees: Boričić, Marković (SRB)

12 August 2018; 14:30	Slovenia	24–28	Iceland	Varaždin Arena, Varaždin; Attendance: 250; Referees: Mertinian, Syrepisios (GRE)
12 August 2018; 14:30	Kljun 8	(8–15)	Þrastarson 12	Varaždin Arena, Varaždin; Attendance: 250; Referees: Mertinian, Syrepisios (GRE)
12 August 2018; 14:30	1× (yellow card) 4× (suspension)	Report	3× (yellow card) 6× (suspension)	Varaždin Arena, Varaždin; Attendance: 250; Referees: Mertinian, Syrepisios (GRE)

12 August 2018; 16:30	Sweden	34–30	Poland	Varaždin Arena, Varaždin; Attendance: 100; Referees: Lončar, Lončar (CRO)
12 August 2018; 16:30	Hallbäck 9	(18–16)	Ścisłowicz 7	Varaždin Arena, Varaždin; Attendance: 100; Referees: Lončar, Lončar (CRO)
12 August 2018; 16:30	2× (yellow card) 2× (suspension)	Report	2× (yellow card) 7× (suspension) 1× (red card)	Varaždin Arena, Varaždin; Attendance: 100; Referees: Lončar, Lončar (CRO)

== Intermediate round ==
=== Group I1 ===
Pos	Team	Pld	W	D	L	GF	GA	GD	Pts	Qualification
1	Norway	3	3	0	0	93	77	+16	6	9–12th place semifinals
2	Portugal	3	2	0	1	87	83	+4	4	9–12th place semifinals
3	Israel	3	1	0	2	75	91	−16	2	13–16th place semifinals
4	Romania	3	0	0	3	85	89	−4	0	13–16th place semifinals

Source: EHF
Rules for classification: 1) points; 2) head-to-head points; 3) head-to-head goal difference; 4) head-to-head number of goals scored; 5) Goal difference.

14 August 2018; 14:30	Israel	28–26	Romania	Sport Hall Fran Galović, Koprivnica; Attendance: 253; Referees: Simone, Monitillo (ITA)
14 August 2018; 14:30	Lumbroso, Mosindi 7	(14–14)	Bodor 6	Sport Hall Fran Galović, Koprivnica; Attendance: 253; Referees: Simone, Monitillo (ITA)
14 August 2018; 14:30	3× (yellow card) 7× (suspension)	Report	2× (yellow card) 6× (suspension)	Sport Hall Fran Galović, Koprivnica; Attendance: 253; Referees: Simone, Monitillo (ITA)

14 August 2018; 16:30	Portugal	26–28	Norway	Sport Hall Fran Galović, Koprivnica; Attendance: 176; Referees: Boričić, Marković (SRB)
14 August 2018; 16:30	M. Costa 9	(11–14)	Grøndahl, Hoftun Lillelien 6	Sport Hall Fran Galović, Koprivnica; Attendance: 176; Referees: Boričić, Marković (SRB)
14 August 2018; 16:30	3× (yellow card) 4× (suspension)	Report	3× (yellow card) 2× (suspension)	Sport Hall Fran Galović, Koprivnica; Attendance: 176; Referees: Boričić, Marković (SRB)

15 August 2018; 14:30	Romania	31–32	Portugal	Sport Hall Fran Galović, Koprivnica; Attendance: 105; Referees: Lončar, Lončar (CRO)
15 August 2018; 14:30	Ghivil 6	(16–18)	M. Costa 10	Sport Hall Fran Galović, Koprivnica; Attendance: 105; Referees: Lončar, Lončar (CRO)
15 August 2018; 14:30	2× (suspension)	Report	3× (yellow card) 5× (suspension)	Sport Hall Fran Galović, Koprivnica; Attendance: 105; Referees: Lončar, Lončar (CRO)

15 August 2018; 16:30	Norway	36–23	Israel	Sport Hall Fran Galović, Koprivnica; Attendance: 150; Referees: Geraets, Geraets (NED)
15 August 2018; 16:30	Blonz, Grøndahl 6	(18–10)	Turkenitz 7	Sport Hall Fran Galović, Koprivnica; Attendance: 150; Referees: Geraets, Geraets (NED)
15 August 2018; 16:30	1× (yellow card) 3× (suspension)	Report	3× (yellow card) 5× (suspension) 1× (red card)	Sport Hall Fran Galović, Koprivnica; Attendance: 150; Referees: Geraets, Geraets (NED)

=== Group I2 ===
Pos	Team	Pld	W	D	L	GF	GA	GD	Pts	Qualification
1	Hungary	3	2	0	1	84	66	+18	4 (Note: Hungary 2 Pts, +8 PD; Slovenia 2 Pts, –1 PD; Russia 2 Pts, –7 PD)	9–12th place semifinals
2	Slovenia	3	2	0	1	81	72	+9	4	9–12th place semifinals
3	Russia	3	2	0	1	74	80	−6	4	13–16th place semifinals
4	Poland	3	0	0	3	68	89	−21	0	13–16th place semifinals

Source: EHF
Rules for classification: 1) points; 2) head-to-head points; 3) head-to-head goal difference; 4) head-to-head number of goals scored; 5) Goal difference.
Notes:

14 August 2018; 14:30	Russia	27–26	Poland	Varaždin Arena, Varaždin; Attendance: 100; Referees: Jović, Arnautović (BIH)
14 August 2018; 14:30	Chan Suan, Iltinskii 6	(12–15)	Czernecki 8	Varaždin Arena, Varaždin; Attendance: 100; Referees: Jović, Arnautović (BIH)
14 August 2018; 14:30	2× (yellow card) 2× (suspension)	Report	3× (yellow card) 2× (suspension)	Varaždin Arena, Varaždin; Attendance: 100; Referees: Jović, Arnautović (BIH)

14 August 2018; 16:30	Hungary	29–20	Slovenia	Varaždin Arena, Varaždin; Attendance: 100; Referees: Geraets, Geraets (NED)
14 August 2018; 16:30	Bálint 8	(18–10)	four players 3	Varaždin Arena, Varaždin; Attendance: 100; Referees: Geraets, Geraets (NED)
14 August 2018; 16:30	3× (yellow card) 1× (suspension)	Report	2× (yellow card) 3× (suspension)	Varaždin Arena, Varaždin; Attendance: 100; Referees: Geraets, Geraets (NED)

15 August 2018; 14:30	Poland	20–30	Hungary	Varaždin Arena, Varaždin; Attendance: 50; Referees: Boričić, Marković (SRB)
15 August 2018; 14:30	Styrcz 7	(9–16)	Bognár, Papp 5	Varaždin Arena, Varaždin; Attendance: 50; Referees: Boričić, Marković (SRB)
15 August 2018; 14:30	2× (yellow card) 4× (suspension)	Report	3× (yellow card) 6× (suspension)	Varaždin Arena, Varaždin; Attendance: 50; Referees: Boričić, Marković (SRB)

15 August 2018; 16:30	Slovenia	29–21	Russia	Varaždin Arena, Varaždin; Attendance: 200; Referees: Simone, Monitillo (ITA)
15 August 2018; 16:30	Kljun 6	(17–13)	Chirkov 4	Varaždin Arena, Varaždin; Attendance: 200; Referees: Simone, Monitillo (ITA)
15 August 2018; 16:30	2× (yellow card) 4× (suspension)	Report	2× (yellow card) 7× (suspension)	Varaždin Arena, Varaždin; Attendance: 200; Referees: Simone, Monitillo (ITA)

== Main round ==
=== Group M1 ===
Pos	Team	Pld	W	D	L	GF	GA	GD	Pts	Qualification
1	Denmark	3	3	0	0	75	65	+10	6	Semifinals
2	Croatia (H)	3	2	0	1	72	62	+10	4	Semifinals
3	France	2	1	0	1	72	75	−3	2	5–8th place semifinals
4	Serbia	2	0	0	2	70	87	−17	0	5–8th place semifinals

Source: EHF
Rules for classification: 1) points; 2) head-to-head points; 3) head-to-head goal difference; 4) head-to-head number of goals scored; 5) Goal difference.
(H) Hosts

14 August 2018; 18:30	Serbia	26–31	France	Sport Hall Fran Galović, Koprivnica; Attendance: 320; Referees: Mertinian, Syrepisios (GRE)
14 August 2018; 18:30	Petrić, Stevanović 5	(12–15)	N'Tanzi 8	Sport Hall Fran Galović, Koprivnica; Attendance: 320; Referees: Mertinian, Syrepisios (GRE)
14 August 2018; 18:30	3× (yellow card) 2× (suspension)	Report	3× (yellow card) 2× (suspension)	Sport Hall Fran Galović, Koprivnica; Attendance: 320; Referees: Mertinian, Syrepisios (GRE)

14 August 2018; 20:30	Croatia	20–22	Denmark	Sport Hall Fran Galović, Koprivnica; Attendance: 689; Referees: Budzák, Záhradník (SVK)
14 August 2018; 20:30	Rukavina 5	(11–13)	Lenbroch 4	Sport Hall Fran Galović, Koprivnica; Attendance: 689; Referees: Budzák, Záhradník (SVK)
14 August 2018; 20:30	2× (yellow card) 4× (suspension)	Report	3× (yellow card) 3× (suspension)	Sport Hall Fran Galović, Koprivnica; Attendance: 689; Referees: Budzák, Záhradník (SVK)

15 August 2018; 18:30	Denmark	29–24	Serbia	Sport Hall Fran Galović, Koprivnica; Attendance: 224; Referees: Ershov, Pavliukov (RUS)
15 August 2018; 18:30	Haubro 5	(13–10)	Nikolić 9	Sport Hall Fran Galović, Koprivnica; Attendance: 224; Referees: Ershov, Pavliukov (RUS)
15 August 2018; 18:30	2× (yellow card) 2× (suspension)	Report	2× (yellow card) 2× (suspension)	Sport Hall Fran Galović, Koprivnica; Attendance: 224; Referees: Ershov, Pavliukov (RUS)

15 August 2018; 20:30	France	20–25	Croatia	Sport Hall Fran Galović, Koprivnica; Attendance: 645; Referees: Bíró, Kiss (HUN)
15 August 2018; 20:30	Cabanes, N'Tanzi 4	(7–12)	Mileta 6	Sport Hall Fran Galović, Koprivnica; Attendance: 645; Referees: Bíró, Kiss (HUN)
15 August 2018; 20:30	3× (yellow card) 3× (suspension)	Report	3× (yellow card) 6× (suspension)	Sport Hall Fran Galović, Koprivnica; Attendance: 645; Referees: Bíró, Kiss (HUN)

=== Group M2 ===
Pos	Team	Pld	W	D	L	GF	GA	GD	Pts	Qualification
1	Iceland	3	2	0	1	79	79	0	4 (Note: Iceland 29–24 Sweden)	Semifinals
2	Sweden	3	2	0	1	82	83	−1	4	Semifinals
3	Germany	3	1	0	2	74	75	−1	2 (Note: Germany 25–22 Spain)	5–8th place semifinals
4	Spain	3	1	0	2	82	80	+2	2	5–8th place semifinals

Source: EHF
Rules for classification: 1) points; 2) head-to-head points; 3) head-to-head goal difference; 4) head-to-head number of goals scored; 5) Goal difference.
Notes:

14 August 2018; 18:30	Spain	27–28	Sweden	Varaždin Arena, Varaždin; Attendance: 250; Referees: Ershov, Pavliukov (RUS)
14 August 2018; 18:30	Calle 9	(11–11)	Hallbäck 10	Varaždin Arena, Varaždin; Attendance: 250; Referees: Ershov, Pavliukov (RUS)
14 August 2018; 18:30	2× (yellow card) 3× (suspension)	Report	2× (yellow card) 2× (suspension)	Varaždin Arena, Varaždin; Attendance: 250; Referees: Ershov, Pavliukov (RUS)

14 August 2018; 20:30	Germany	22–23	Iceland	Varaždin Arena, Varaždin; Attendance: 200; Referees: Lončar, Lončar (CRO)
14 August 2018; 20:30	Mävers 6	(10–13)	Þrastarson 9	Varaždin Arena, Varaždin; Attendance: 200; Referees: Lončar, Lončar (CRO)
14 August 2018; 20:30	3× (yellow card) 2× (suspension)	Report	3× (yellow card) 4× (suspension)	Varaždin Arena, Varaždin; Attendance: 200; Referees: Lončar, Lončar (CRO)

15 August 2018; 18:30	Sweden	30–27	Germany	Varaždin Arena, Varaždin; Attendance: 100; Referees: Mertinian, Syrepisios (GRE)
15 August 2018; 18:30	Chrintz 11	(14–14)	Durmaz 6	Varaždin Arena, Varaždin; Attendance: 100; Referees: Mertinian, Syrepisios (GRE)
15 August 2018; 18:30	4× (yellow card) 3× (suspension) 1× (red card)	Report	3× (yellow card) 3× (suspension)	Varaždin Arena, Varaždin; Attendance: 100; Referees: Mertinian, Syrepisios (GRE)

15 August 2018; 20:30	Iceland	27–33	Spain	Varaždin Arena, Varaždin; Attendance: 250; Referees: Budzák, Záhradník (SVK)
15 August 2018; 20:30	Sindrason 5	(13–18)	Izquierdo 7	Varaždin Arena, Varaždin; Attendance: 250; Referees: Budzák, Záhradník (SVK)
15 August 2018; 20:30	3× (yellow card) 4× (suspension)	Report	2× (yellow card) 6× (suspension)	Varaždin Arena, Varaždin; Attendance: 250; Referees: Budzák, Záhradník (SVK)

== Final round ==
=== Bracket ===
Championship bracket

Semifinals
17 August
Denmark	22
Sweden	31
17 August
Iceland	30
Croatia	26

Final
19 August
Sweden	32
Iceland	27
Third place
19 August
Denmark	26
Croatia	24

9th place bracket

9–12th place semifinals
17 August
Norway	19
Slovenia	28
17 August
Hungary	24
Portugal	22

9th place
18 August
Slovenia	26
Hungary	23
11th place
18 August
Norway	28
Portugal	24

5th place bracket

5–8th place semifinals
17 August
France	20
Spain	23
17 August
Germany	32
Serbia	27

5th place
19 August
Spain	28
Germany	26
7th place
19 August
France	39
Serbia	23

13th place bracket

13–16th place semifinals
17 August
Israel	30
Poland	20
17 August
Russia	35
Romania	26

13th place
18 August
Israel	21
Russia	26
15th place
18 August
Poland	39
Romania	28

=== 13–16th place semifinals ===
17 August 2018; 13:00	Israel	30–20	Poland	Sport Hall Fran Galović, Koprivnica; Attendance: 56; Referees: Simone, Monitillo (ITA)
17 August 2018; 13:00	Shneider, Turkenitz 8	(12–12)	Styrcz 6	Sport Hall Fran Galović, Koprivnica; Attendance: 56; Referees: Simone, Monitillo (ITA)
17 August 2018; 13:00	3× (yellow card) 2× (suspension) 1× (red card)	Report	3× (yellow card) 5× (suspension)	Sport Hall Fran Galović, Koprivnica; Attendance: 56; Referees: Simone, Monitillo (ITA)

17 August 2018; 15:30	Russia	35–26	Romania	Sport Hall Fran Galović, Koprivnica; Attendance: 50; Referees: Geraets, Geraets (NED)
17 August 2018; 15:30	Ivanov 7	(16–11)	Brăescu 6	Sport Hall Fran Galović, Koprivnica; Attendance: 50; Referees: Geraets, Geraets (NED)
17 August 2018; 15:30	3× (yellow card) 6× (suspension)	Report	3× (yellow card) 3× (suspension)	Sport Hall Fran Galović, Koprivnica; Attendance: 50; Referees: Geraets, Geraets (NED)

=== 9–12th place semifinals ===
17 August 2018; 18:00	Norway	19–28	Slovenia	Sport Hall Fran Galović, Koprivnica; Attendance: 108; Referees: Lončar, Lončar (CRO)
17 August 2018; 18:00	Grøndahl 4	(12–8)	Jezernik 7	Sport Hall Fran Galović, Koprivnica; Attendance: 108; Referees: Lončar, Lončar (CRO)
17 August 2018; 18:00	1× (yellow card) 3× (suspension)	Report	2× (yellow card) 2× (suspension)	Sport Hall Fran Galović, Koprivnica; Attendance: 108; Referees: Lončar, Lončar (CRO)

17 August 2018; 20:30	Hungary	24–22	Portugal	Sport Hall Fran Galović, Koprivnica; Attendance: 100; Referees: Ershov, Pavliukov (RUS)
17 August 2018; 20:30	Bálint 7	(12–12)	M. Costa, Salvador 4	Sport Hall Fran Galović, Koprivnica; Attendance: 100; Referees: Ershov, Pavliukov (RUS)
17 August 2018; 20:30	2× (yellow card) 3× (suspension)	Report	1× (yellow card) 2× (suspension)	Sport Hall Fran Galović, Koprivnica; Attendance: 100; Referees: Ershov, Pavliukov (RUS)

=== 5–8th place semifinals ===
17 August 2018; 13:00	France	20–23	Spain	Varaždin Arena, Varaždin; Attendance: 150; Referees: Jović, Arnautović (BIH)
17 August 2018; 13:00	Ntanzi 7	(10–13)	Roca 6	Varaždin Arena, Varaždin; Attendance: 150; Referees: Jović, Arnautović (BIH)
17 August 2018; 13:00	3× (yellow card) 4× (suspension)	Report	3× (yellow card) 3× (suspension)	Varaždin Arena, Varaždin; Attendance: 150; Referees: Jović, Arnautović (BIH)

17 August 2018; 15:30	Germany	32–27	Serbia	Varaždin Arena, Varaždin; Attendance: 101; Referees: Bíró, Kiss (HUN)
17 August 2018; 15:30	Knorr 8	(14–13)	Nikolić 11	Varaždin Arena, Varaždin; Attendance: 101; Referees: Bíró, Kiss (HUN)
17 August 2018; 15:30	2× (yellow card) 4× (suspension)	Report	2× (yellow card) 5× (suspension) 1× (red card)	Varaždin Arena, Varaždin; Attendance: 101; Referees: Bíró, Kiss (HUN)

=== Semifinals ===
17 August 2018; 18:00	Denmark	22–31	Sweden	Varaždin Arena, Varaždin; Attendance: 250; Referees: Boričić, Marković (SRB)
17 August 2018; 18:00	Hoxer Hangaard 6	(10–15)	Hallbäck 5	Varaždin Arena, Varaždin; Attendance: 250; Referees: Boričić, Marković (SRB)
17 August 2018; 18:00	3× (yellow card) 1× (suspension)	Report	3× (yellow card) 3× (suspension)	Varaždin Arena, Varaždin; Attendance: 250; Referees: Boričić, Marković (SRB)

17 August 2018; 20:30	Iceland	30–26	Croatia	Varaždin Arena, Varaždin; Attendance: 720; Referees: Budzák, Záhradník (SVK)
17 August 2018; 20:30	Þrastarson 10	(13–12)	Ivanković 5	Varaždin Arena, Varaždin; Attendance: 720; Referees: Budzák, Záhradník (SVK)
17 August 2018; 20:30	2× (yellow card) 3× (suspension)	Report	3× (yellow card) 5× (suspension)	Varaždin Arena, Varaždin; Attendance: 720; Referees: Budzák, Záhradník (SVK)

=== 15th place game ===
18 August 2018; 13:00	Poland	39–28	Romania	Sport Hall Fran Galović, Koprivnica; Attendance: 51; Referees: Geraets, Geraets (NED)
18 August 2018; 13:00	Styrcz 7	(20–13)	three players 4	Sport Hall Fran Galović, Koprivnica; Attendance: 51; Referees: Geraets, Geraets (NED)
18 August 2018; 13:00	3× (yellow card) 3× (suspension)	Report	2× (yellow card) 1× (suspension)	Sport Hall Fran Galović, Koprivnica; Attendance: 51; Referees: Geraets, Geraets (NED)

=== 13th place game ===
18 August 2018; 15:30	Israel	21–26	Russia	Sport Hall Fran Galović, Koprivnica; Attendance: 100; Referees: Mertinian, Syrepisios (GRE)
18 August 2018; 15:30	Amiel 6	(9–16)	three players 4	Sport Hall Fran Galović, Koprivnica; Attendance: 100; Referees: Mertinian, Syrepisios (GRE)
18 August 2018; 15:30	3× (yellow card) 4× (suspension)	Report	2× (yellow card) 3× (suspension)	Sport Hall Fran Galović, Koprivnica; Attendance: 100; Referees: Mertinian, Syrepisios (GRE)

=== Eleventh place game ===
18 August 2018; 18:00	Norway	28–24	Portugal	Sport Hall Fran Galović, Koprivnica; Attendance: 195; Referees: Budzák, Záhradník (SVK)
18 August 2018; 18:00	Grøndahl, Hoftun Lillelien 6	(11–13)	M. Costa, Ribeiro 6	Sport Hall Fran Galović, Koprivnica; Attendance: 195; Referees: Budzák, Záhradník (SVK)
18 August 2018; 18:00	2× (yellow card) 3× (suspension)	Report	3× (yellow card) 6× (suspension) 1× (red card)	Sport Hall Fran Galović, Koprivnica; Attendance: 195; Referees: Budzák, Záhradník (SVK)

=== Ninth place game ===
18 August 2018; 20:30	Slovenia	26–23	Hungary	Sport Hall Fran Galović, Koprivnica; Attendance: 136; Referees: Jović, Arnautović (BIH)
18 August 2018; 20:30	Tajnik 6	(16–10)	Bognár 7	Sport Hall Fran Galović, Koprivnica; Attendance: 136; Referees: Jović, Arnautović (BIH)
18 August 2018; 20:30	3× (yellow card) 2× (suspension)	Report	3× (yellow card) 2× (suspension)	Sport Hall Fran Galović, Koprivnica; Attendance: 136; Referees: Jović, Arnautović (BIH)

=== Seventh place game ===
19 August 2018; 10:00	France	39–23	Serbia	Varaždin Arena, Varaždin; Attendance: 105; Referees: Simone, Monitillo (ITA)
19 August 2018; 10:00	Paschal 13	(19–12)	Petrić 5	Varaždin Arena, Varaždin; Attendance: 105; Referees: Simone, Monitillo (ITA)
19 August 2018; 10:00	3× (yellow card) 5× (suspension)	Report	2× (yellow card) 2× (suspension)	Varaždin Arena, Varaždin; Attendance: 105; Referees: Simone, Monitillo (ITA)

=== Fifth place game ===
19 August 2018; 12:30	Spain	28–26	Germany	Varaždin Arena, Varaždin; Attendance: 100; Referees: Boričić, Marković (SRB)
19 August 2018; 12:30	Calle 5	(15–15)	Mävers, Weber 4	Varaždin Arena, Varaždin; Attendance: 100; Referees: Boričić, Marković (SRB)
19 August 2018; 12:30	3× (yellow card) 2× (suspension)	Report	3× (yellow card) 5× (suspension)	Varaždin Arena, Varaždin; Attendance: 100; Referees: Boričić, Marković (SRB)

=== Third place game ===
19 August 2018; 15:00	Denmark	26–24	Croatia	Varaždin Arena, Varaždin; Attendance: 1,021; Referees: Bíró, Kiss (HUN)
19 August 2018; 15:00	Leger 6	(14–10)	Martinović, Mileta 6	Varaždin Arena, Varaždin; Attendance: 1,021; Referees: Bíró, Kiss (HUN)
19 August 2018; 15:00	2× (yellow card) 5× (suspension)	Report	1× (yellow card) 4× (suspension)	Varaždin Arena, Varaždin; Attendance: 1,021; Referees: Bíró, Kiss (HUN)

=== Final ===
19 August 2018; 17:30	Sweden	32–27	Iceland	Varaždin Arena, Varaždin; Attendance: 1,250; Referees: Lončar, Lončar (CRO)
19 August 2018; 17:30	Hallbäck 11	(12–12)	Þórarinsson 7	Varaždin Arena, Varaždin; Attendance: 1,250; Referees: Lončar, Lončar (CRO)
19 August 2018; 17:30	3× (yellow card) 2× (suspension)	Report	2× (yellow card) 4× (suspension)	Varaždin Arena, Varaždin; Attendance: 1,250; Referees: Lončar, Lončar (CRO)

== Final ranking ==
Qualified for the 2019 Men's Youth World Handball Championship
Relegated to the Men’s 18 EHF Championship 2020

Rank	Team
1st place, gold medalist(s)	Sweden
2nd place, silver medalist(s)	Iceland
3rd place, bronze medalist(s)	Denmark
4	Croatia
5	Spain
6	Germany
7	France
8	Serbia
9	Slovenia
10	Hungary
11	Norway
12	Portugal
13	Russia
14	Israel
15	Poland
16	Romania

== Awards ==
Award	Player
Most Valuable Player	(Iceland) Haukur Þrastarson
Best Defence Player	(Croatia) Gianfranco Pribetić
Topscorer	(Sweden) Ludvig Hallbäck (56 goals)

All-Star Team

Position	Player
Goalkeeper	(Sweden) Fabian Norsten
Right wing	(Sweden) Valter Chrintz
Right back	(Serbia) Jovica Nikolić
Centre back	(France) Sadou N'Tanzi
Left back	(Germany) Juri Knorr
Left wing	(Iceland) Dagur Gautason
Pivot	(Denmark) Thor Christensen
