= Norsten =

Norsten is a surname. Notable people with the surname include:

- Carissa Norsten (born 2003), Canadian rugby union and rugby sevens athlete
- Fabian Norsten (born 2000), Swedish handball player
