= Ludvig Hallbäck =

Swedish handball player (born 2000)

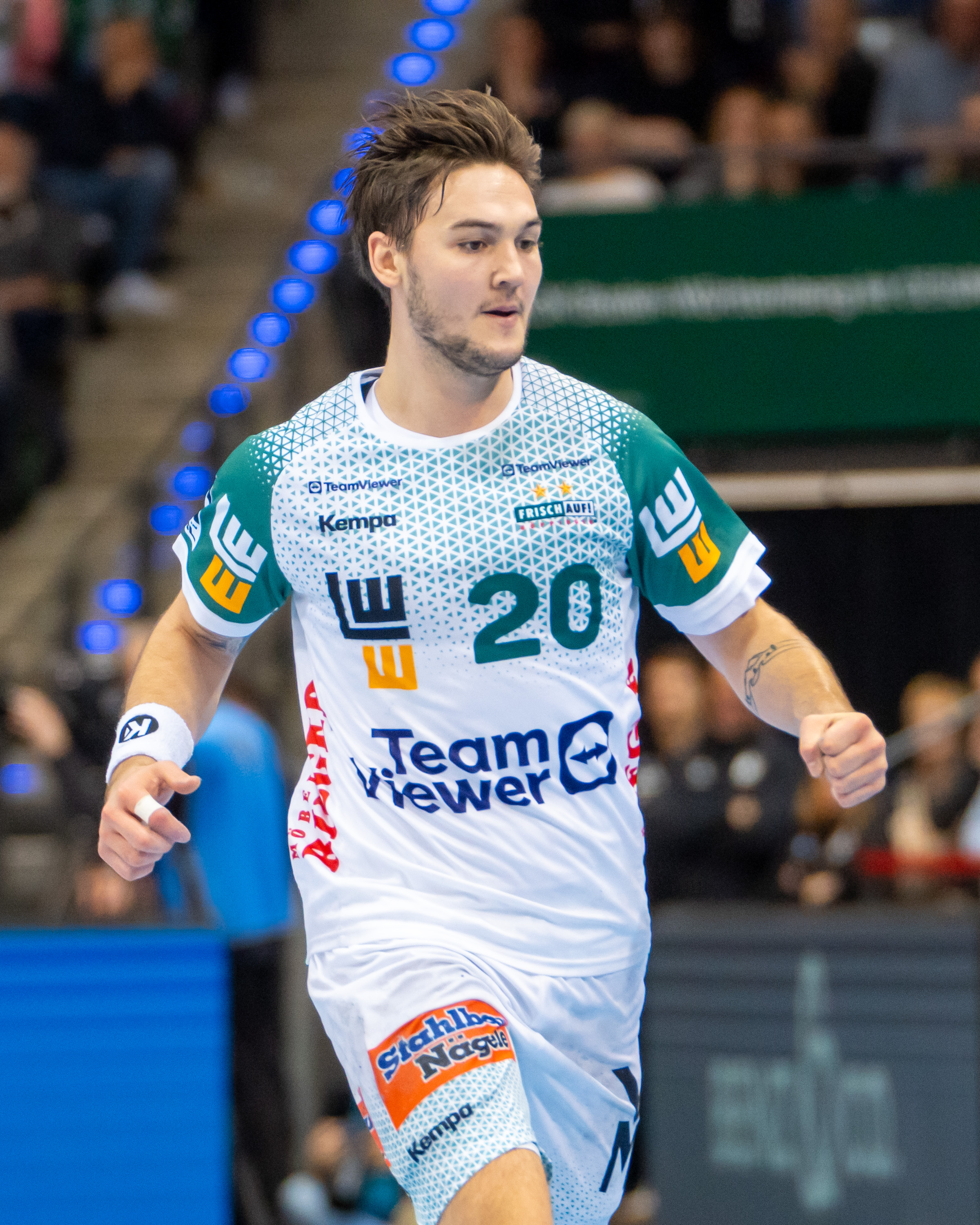

Personal information
- Nationality: Swedish
- Born: 27 October 2000 (age 25) Gothenburg, Sweden
- Height: 1.84 m (6 ft 0 in)

Sport
- Sport: Handball
- Position: Centre back
- Current club: Frisch Auf Göppingen
- Number: 20

Senior clubs
- Years: Team
- –2017: HK Aranäs
- 2017–2021: Ystads IF
- 2021–2024: Bjerringbro-Silkeborg Håndbold
- 2024–: Frisch Auf Göppingen
National team
Years	Team	Apps	(Gls)
–	Sweden	2	(1)
Medal record
Youth European Championship
Gold medal – first place	2018 Croatia
- Updated on 1 January 2026

Ludvig Hallbäck (born 27 October 2000) is a Swedish handball player who plays for German club Frisch Auf Göppingen.

== Career ==
Hallbäck started his career at HK Aranäs, where his father, Jerry Hallbäck, was a coach. In 2017 he joined Ystads IF together with his father, where his brother Anton also played. Here he named player of the month in July/August in both 2017 and 2018.

In 2021 he joined Danish side Bjerringbro-Silkeborg. In the 2021-22 season he won bronze medals with the team. He left the team in 2024 to join German side Frisch Auf Göppingen.

In April 2025 he had an elbow injury and missed the rest of the season.

== International honours ==
- Youth European Championship:
  - Gold Medalist: 2018

== Individual awards ==
- Youth European Championship Top Scorer: 2018

== Personal life ==
He is the son of former Swedish international Jerry Hallbäck, and brother to current handball Anton Hallbäck.
