= Hassan Kaddah =

Egyptian handball player

Personal information
- Full name: Hassan Walid Ahmed Kaddah
- Nationality: Egyptian
- Born: 1 May 2000 (age 26)
- Height: 205 cm (81 in)

Sport
- Sport: Handball
- Position: Left back

Youth career
- Years: Team
- –: Al-Shams Club

Senior clubs
- Years: Team
- 2018–2023: Zamalek SC
- 2022: → Khaleej Club (loan)
- 2023–2025: Industria Kielce
National team
| Years | Team | Apps | (Gls) |
| 2020– | Egypt | 49 | (48) |
Medal record
African Championship
| Gold medal – first place | 2020 Tunisia |
| Gold medal – first place | 2022 Egypt |
| Gold medal – first place | 2024 Egypt |
Youth World Championship
| Gold medal – first place | 2019 North Macedonia |
Mediterranean Games
| Silver medal – second place | 2022 Oran | Team |
Junior World Championship
| Bronze medal – third place | 2019 Spain |

Hassan Walid Ahmed Kaddah (born 1 May 2000) is an Egyptian handball player for the Egyptian national team.

== Career ==
He first started handball at Al-Shams Club. He then played for Zamalek SC, where he won the Egyptian Handball League in 2019, 2020, 2021 and 2022, the 2022 Egyptian Superup, the 2019 African Handball Champions League, the 2022 CAHB Cup Winners' Cup and the 2019 and 2021 African Supercup. In October 2022 he joined the Saudi-Arabian club Khaleej Club on a one-month loan for the 2022 IHF Men's Super Globe. With 45 goals he was the top scorer of the tournament. From the summer of 2023 he joined Industria Kielce.

=== National team ===
He participated at the 2019 Youth World Championship, where he became top scorer and chosen for the All-Star Team as best left back. He also participated at the 2019 Junior World Championship.

With the Egyptian senior national team he won the 2020 and 2022, 2024 African championships. He represented Egypt at the 2021 World Championship and the 2020 Summer Olympics in Tokyo, where Egypt finished at a surprising 4th place. At the 2023 World Championship he reached the quarterfinal with Egypt.

== Honours ==
Club

Zamalek SC

- Egyptian Handball League: 2020, 2021, 2022
- Egyptian Super Cup: 2022
- Egyptian Professional Super Cup: 2022
- African Handball Champions League: 2019
- African Handball Super Cup: 2021
- African Cup Winners' Cup: 2022, 2023

KS Iskra Kielce

- Polish Handball Cup: 2025
- Polish Super Cup: 2025

International

Egypt

- IHF Youth World Championship: 2019
- African Championship: 2020, 2022, 2024

Individual

- Top scorer at the 2019 Youth World Championship
- Best left back at the 2019 Youth World Championship
- Top scorer at the 2022 IHF Super Globe
