= Abdelrahman Mohamed (handballer) =

Egyptian handballer

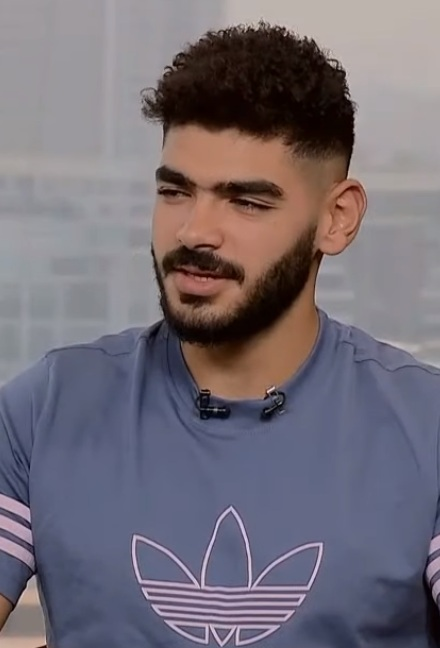
- Abdelrahman Mohamed interviewed by Al-Ahly TV, 10 August 2020

Personal information
- Nationality: Egypt
- Born: 15 August 2000 (age 26)

Sport
- Sport: Handball
- Position: Goalkeeper

Senior clubs
- Years: Team
- –: Al Ahly SC
National team
- Years: Team
- –: Egypt junior

Abdelrahman Mohamed Homayed (born 15 January 2000) is an Egyptian male handball player. He is 195 cm tall and weighs around 95 kg. He is a member of the Al Ahly SC. He was a part of the Egyptian National team that won the 2019 Men's Youth World Handball Championship. He also played at 2019 Men's Junior World Handball Championship, where the team stood at 3rd position. He won the best goalkeeper in the world trophy at the 2019 Handball World Youth Championship.

Abdelrahman Mohamed also won man of the match trophy in the 2021-2022 Egyptian league final four matches during Al Ahly's match vs ASC.
