= Ahmed Hesham =

Egyptian handball player (born 2000)

Personal information
- Full name: Ahmed Mohamed Hesham El-Sayed
- Nationality: Egyptian
- Born: 15 May 2000 (age 26) Cairo, Egypt
- Height: 1.94 m (6 ft 4 in)

Sport
- Sport: Handball
- Position: Left Back/Central Back
- Current club: ONE Veszprém
- Number: 15

Youth career
- Years: Team
- 2016–2018: Heliopolis SC

Senior clubs
- Years: Team
- 2018–2020: Heliopolis SC
- 2020–2023: USAM Nîmes Gard
- 2023–2025: Montpellier Handball
- 2025–: ONE Veszprém
National team
Years	Team	Apps	(Gls)
2020–	Egypt	58	(77)
Medal record
African Championship
Gold medal – first place	2020 Tunisia
Gold medal – first place	2024 Egypt
Gold medal – first place	2026 Rwanda
Youth World Championship
Gold medal – first place	2019 North Macedonia
Junior World Championship
Bronze medal – third place	2019 Spain

Ahmed Mohamed Hesham El-Sayed (Arabic: احمد محمد هشام السيد; born 15 May 2000), known as Ahmed Hesham (أحمد هشام), Ahmed Mohamed, or Ahmed Mohamed Hesham, is an Egyptian handball player who plays for Montpellier Handball and the Egyptian national team.

He participated in the World Men's Handball Championship in 2021, 2023, 2025 and in 2020 Summer Olympics and 2024 Summer Olympics.

== Honours ==
Club

Montpellier

- Coupe de France: 2025

Veszprém KC

- Nemzeti Bajnokság I: 2025–26
- Magyar Kupa: 2025–26
- Super Globe: 2026

International

Egypt

- Youth World Championship: 2019
- African Championship: 2020, 2024, 2026

Individual

- Best player at the 2019 Youth World Championship
