= Fabian Norsten =

Swedish handball player (born 2000)

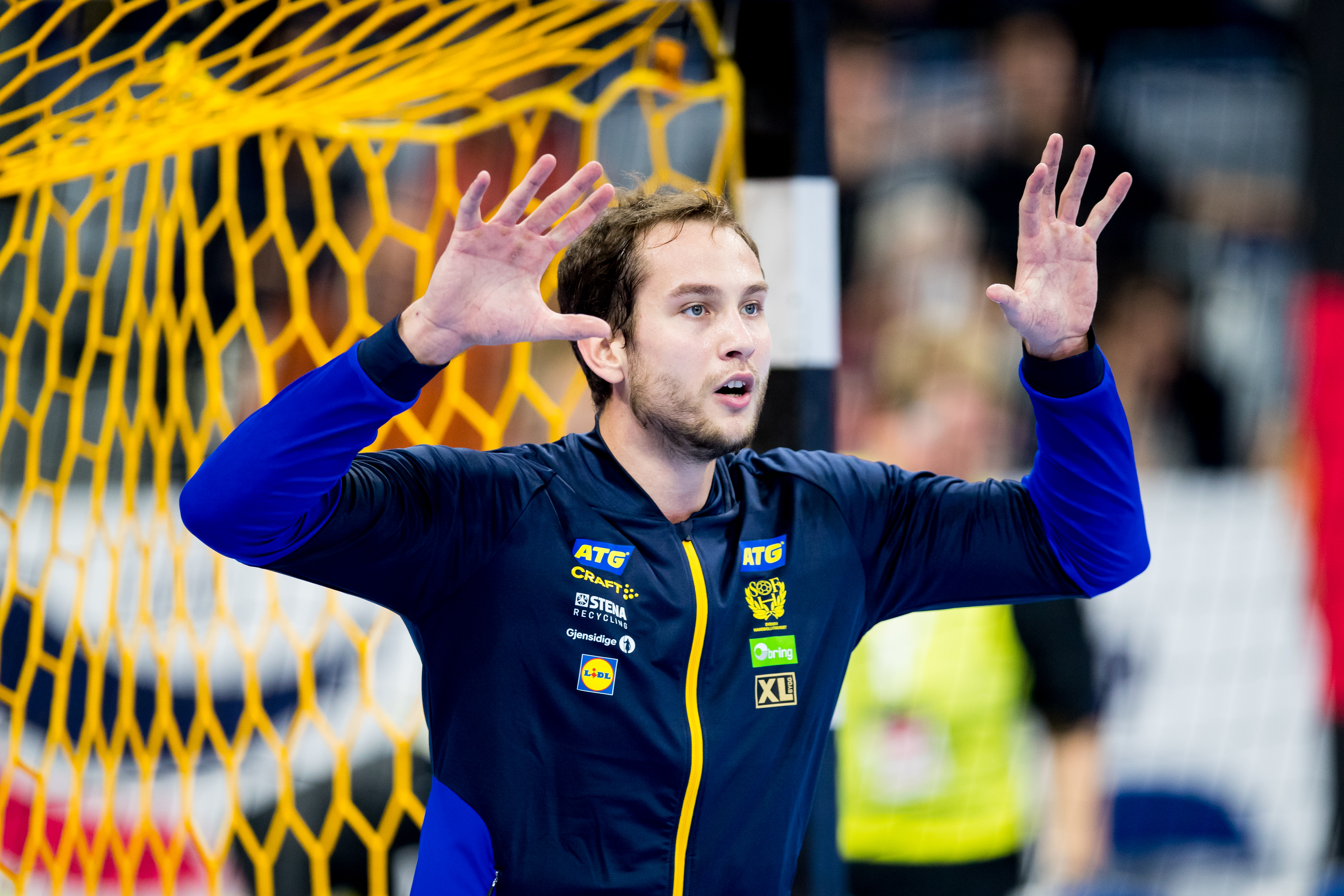

Personal information
- Nationality: Swedish
- Born: 11 July 2000 (age 26) Stockholm, Sweden
- Height: 1.96 m (6 ft 5 in)

Sport
- Sport: Handball
- Position: Goalkeeper
- Current club: Aalborg Håndbold
- Number: 12

Youth career
- Years: Team
- –: Tyresö Handboll

Senior clubs
- Years: Team
- 2018–2019: Hammarby IF
- 2019–2022: IFK Skövde
- 2022–2023: VfL Gummersbach
- 2023–: Aalborg Håndbold
National team
Years	Team	Apps	(Gls)
2022–	Sweden	17	(0)
Medal record
European Championship
Gold medal – first place	2022 Hungary/Slovakia
European U-18 Championship
Gold medal – first place	2018 Croatia
- Updated on 14 January 2026

Fabian Norsten (born 11 July 2000) is a Swedish handball player for the Danish club Aalborg Håndbold and the Swedish national team.

He was a part of the Sweden team, that won the 2022 European Men's Handball Championship, but he was never selected for match squad. He debuted for the Swedish national team in March 2022.

== Career ==
Norsten played youth handball at Tyresö Handboll, before joining Hammarby IF followed by IFK Skövde.

In 2022 he joined German club VfL Gummersbach on a 1-year contract. When that ran out, he joined Danish club Aalborg Håndbold, where he mainly played as a back-up to Niklas Landin. He won the Danish Championship in his first season at the club. In 2025 he won the Danish Cup with Aalborg Håndbold, beating Bjerringbro-Silkeborg in the final. Later the same season he won the Danish championship. In 2026 he extended his contract with the club until 2029.

== Achievements ==
- EHF Champions League:
  - Silver: 2024
- Danish Championship:
  - Gold: 2024, 2025, 2026
- Danish Cup
  - Gold: 2025

Individual awards

- All-Star Team as Best goalkeeper at the 2018 European U-18 Championship
