= Haukur Þrastarson =

Icelandic handball player (born 2001)

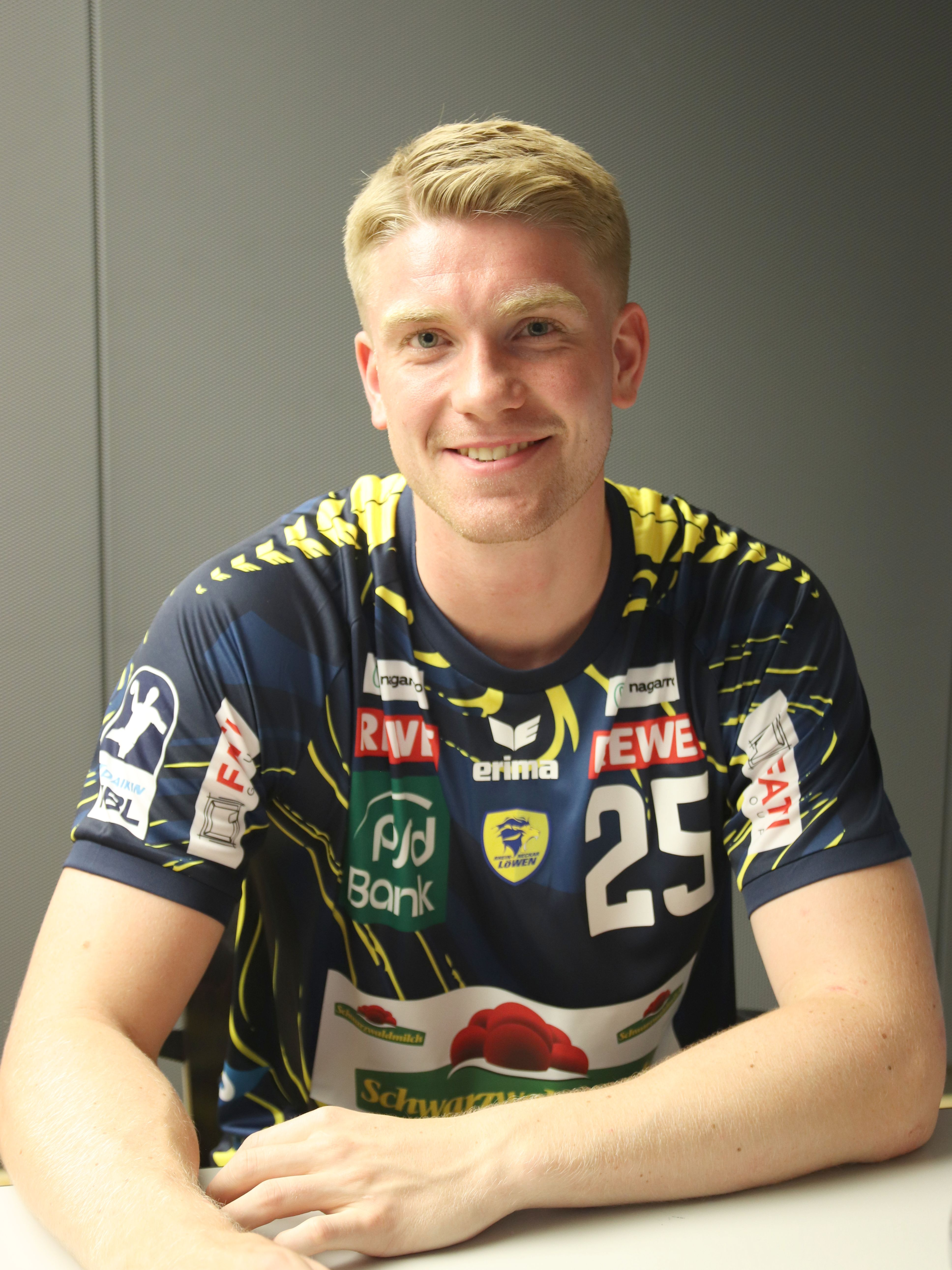

Personal information
- Nationality: Icelandic
- Born: 14 April 2001 (age 25) Selfoss, Iceland
- Height: 1.92 m (6 ft 4 in)

Sport
- Sport: Handball
- Position: Centre back
- Current club: Rhein-Neckar Löwen
- Number: 25

Youth career
- Years: Team
- 2007–2016: Selfoss

Senior clubs
- Years: Team
- 2016–2020: Selfoss
- 2020–2024: Industria Kielce
- 2024–2025: Dinamo Bucuresti
- 2025–: Rhein-Neckar Löwen
National team
Years	Team	Apps	(Gls)
2018–	Iceland	18	(21)
Medal record
Youth European Championship
Silver medal – second place	2018 Croatia

Haukur Þrastarson (born 14 April 2001) is an Icelandic handball player for Rhein-Neckar Löwen and the Icelandic national team.

== Club career ==
Haukur Þrastarson made his debut for his boyhood club Selfoss in the 2016/2017 season, when he was only 15 years old. In 2019, at the age of 18, Þrastarson played a key role in his boyhood club winning the Icelandic Championship for the first time in the club's history.

In 2020, Þrastarson transferred to Polish giants Łomża Vive Kielce. In July 2020, before the season began, he suffered a midfoot fracture; despite this, Kielce extended his contract from three to five years, running until 2025. Only weeks after his return, he sustained a torn anterior cruciate ligament (ACL) in his left knee during a Champions League match against Elverum.

With Kielce, Þrastarson won the Polish championship in 2021, 2022, and 2023, as well as the Polish Cup in 2021. He also competed in the EHF Champions League, where Kielce reached the Final Four in both 2022 and 2023, finishing runners-up on both occasions. In early December 2022, he suffered another ACL injury—this time to his right knee—during a Champions League match against Szeged. Þrastarson made his comeback in September 2023.

In the summer of 2024 he prematurely terminated his contract with Kielce and joined Romanian first division club Dinamo Bucharest. With Bucharest, he won the Romanian championship in 2025, the Romanian Cup and reached the Champions League play-offs against eventual winners SC Magdeburg.

For the 2025/26 season, he signed a contract with the German Bundesliga club Rhein-Neckar Löwen.

== International career ==
Haukur was chosen the Most Valuable Player of the 2018 European Men's U-18 Handball Championship in Croatia when he helped Iceland's U-18 secure silver at the tournament. On 5 April 2018 he made his debut for the Icelandic national team in a 29–31 loss against Norway in a friendly. In 2019 he participated World Men's Handball Championship when he replaced Aron Pálmarsson, who was injured, he played two games against France and Brazil and scored two goals. He was the youngest player of the tournament and became the youngest Icelandic player to participate at a world championship.

At the 2026 European Men's Handball Championship he finished 4th with Iceland, losing to Denmark in the semifinal and Croatia in the third-place playoff.
