= Sadou Ntanzi =

French handball player (born 2000)

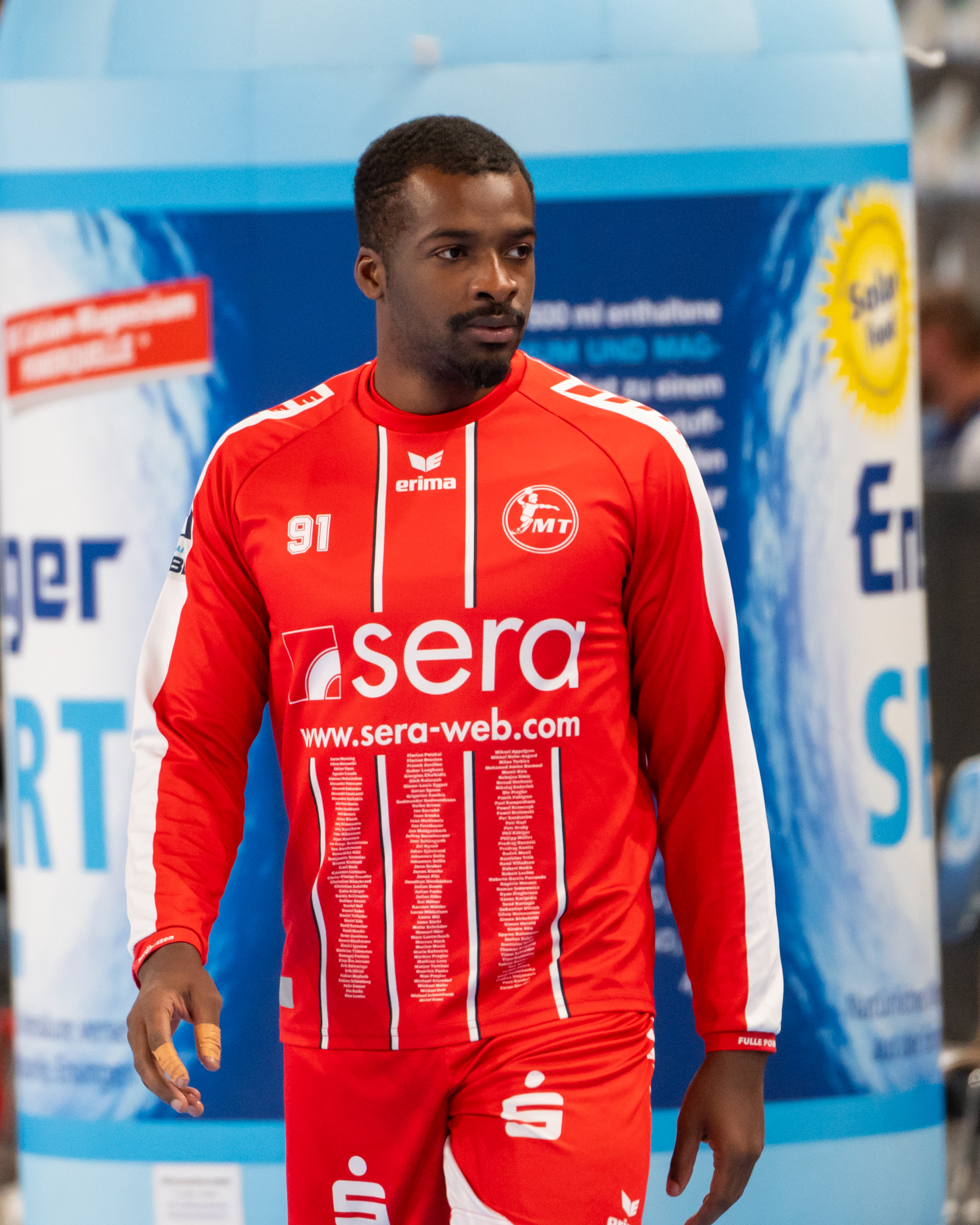

Personal information
- Born: 7 January 2000 (age 26) Longjumeau, France
- Height: 1.83 m (6 ft 0 in)

Sport
- Sport: Handball
- Position: Central Back
- Current club: RK Eurofarm Pelister

Youth career
- Years: Team
- 2008–2017: Savigny HB
- 2017–2020: Paris Saint-Germain

Senior clubs
- Years: Team
- 2020–2024: (France) Paris Saint-Germain
- 2020–2021: → (France) Fenix Toulouse (loan)
- 2024–2025: (Hungary) MOL Tatabánya KC
- 2025–2026: (Qatar) Al Arabi SC
- 2025: → (Germany) MT Melsungen (loan)
- 2026–: (North Macedonia) RK Eurofarm Pelister

Sadou Ntanzi (born 7 January 2000) is a French handball player for RK Eurofarm Pelister.

== Career ==
=== Club ===
As a child Sadou Ntanzit also practiced Judo, but eventually chose handball.

He started his career at Savigny HB. He joined Paris Saint-Germain in 2017, where he first played for the reserves in the third division. On April 4, 2019, he played his first match with Paris Saint-Germain's professional team in the LNH Division 1 against US Ivry Handball, then on October 13, 2019. He participated in his first EHF Champions League match against RK Celje, where he scored 2 goals. In the summer of 2020, he extended his contract with Paris Saint-Germain until 2024. In November 2020, Luc Steins was loaned by Paris Saint-Germain from Fenix Toulouse, in return Ntanzi was loaned to the Fenix Toulouse team until the end of the season. He made his EHF European League debut here on November 24, 2020, against CB Ademar León, scoring 3 goals. He scored 13 goals in a total of 5 matches in the EHF European League. After the loan, he returned to Paris Saint-Germain, but did not get a continuous opportunity to play alongside Nikola Karabatic and Luc Steins. In January 2024, it was announced that he would transfer to the number three Hungarian club, MOL Tatabánya KC, from the summer. After 1 season, in the summer of 2025, he signed with the Qatari team Al Arabi SC. Al Arabi SC loaned him to German team MT Melsungen from September 2025 to December 2025. In the summer 2026 he moved to Macedonian RK Eurofarm Pelister

=== National team ===
In 2018, he finished 7th with the French U18 national team at the Youth European Championship, but was still selected for the tournament's all-star team.

== Honours ==
=== Club ===
Paris Saint-Germain

- LNH Division 1
  - Gold: 2021, 2022, 2023, 2024
- Coupe de France
  - Gold: 2022
  - Silver: 2024
- Trophée des Champions
  - Gold: 2023
  - Silver: 2022

MOL Tatabánya KC

- Magyar Kupa
  - Bronze: 2025

=== Individual ===
- All-Star Centre Back of the Youth European Championship: 2018
