= José Luciano Costa da Silva =

Brazilian handball player (born 2000)

José Luciano
Personal information
- Full name: José Luciano Costa da Silva
- Nationality: Brazilian
- Born: 19 February 2000 (age 26)
- Height: 1.98 m (6 ft 6 in)

Sport
- Sport: Handball
- Position: Left Back
- Current club: USAM Nîmes Gard
- Number: 34

Senior clubs
- Years: Team
- –: Handebol Clube Taubaté
- 2020–2023: S.L. Benfica
- 2023: BM Logroño La Rioja
- 2023: Al-Hada
- 2024: Balonmano Sinfín
- 2024–: USAM Nîmes Gard
- 2025–: → Madeira Andebol SAD
National team
- Years: Team
- –: Brazil
Medal record
South and Central American Youth Championship
Gold medal – first place	2019 Brazil

José Luciano Costa da Silva (born 19 February 2000) is a Brazilian handball player for USAM Nîmes Gard and the Brazilian national team.

He participated at the 2021 World Men's Handball Championship.

== Honours ==
Benfica

- EHF European League: 2021–22
