= South and Central American Men's Youth Handball Championship =

Handball competition

- Current season, competition or edition: 2026 South and Central American Men's Youth Handball Championship
- Sport: Handball
- Founded: 2019
- First season: 2019
- No. of teams: 6
- Continent: SCAHC (South America/Central America)
- Most recent champion: Argentina (2nd title)
- Most titles: Brazil; Argentina (2 titles each)

The South and Central American Men's Youth Handball Championship is the official competition for under 18 (U-18) national handball teams of South America and Central America, and takes place every two years. In addition to crowning the South and Central American junior champions, the tournament also serves as a qualifying tournament for the World Junior Handball Championship. The first tournament was held in 2019 in Taubaté, Brazil.

== Summaries ==
Year	Host	Final			Third place match		
Year	Host	Champion	Score	Runner-up	Third place	Score	Fourth place
2019; Details	(Brazil); Taubaté	Brazil	Round-robin	Argentina	Chile	Round-robin	Paraguay
2022; Details	(Argentina); Buenos Aires	Argentina	26–19	Brazil	Chile	23–19	Uruguay
2024; Details	(Nicaragua); Managua	Brazil	19–17	Argentina	Uruguay	24–23	Chile
2026; Details	(Paraguay); Asunción	Argentina	18–15	Brazil	Chile	36–27	Uruguay

== Medal table ==
Rank	Nation	Gold	Silver	Bronze	Total
1	Argentina	2	2	0	4
1	Brazil	2	2	0	4
3	Chile	0	0	3	3
4	Uruguay	0	0	1	1
Totals (4 entries)		4	4	4	12

== Participating nations ==
Team	(Brazil); 2019	(Argentina); 2022	(Nicaragua); 2024	(Paraguay); 2026	Years
Argentina	2nd	1st	2nd	1st	4
Brazil	1st	2nd	1st	2nd	4
Chile	3rd	3rd	4th	3rd	4
Colombia	5th		7th	7th	3
El Salvador				8th	1
Guatemala		7th	8th		2
Nicaragua		5th	5th	5th	3
Paraguay	4th	8th	6th	6th	4
Uruguay	6th	4th	3rd	4th	4
Venezuela		6th			1
Total	6	8	8	8	
