= 2023 IHF Men's U19 Handball World Championship =

Handball championship held in Croatia

- Logo of the championship

Tournament details
- Host country: Croatia
- Venues: 4 (in 4 host cities)
- Dates: 2–13 August
- Teams: 32 (from 6 confederations)

Final positions
- Champions: Spain (1st title)
- Runners-up: Denmark
- Third place: Croatia
- Fourth place: Egypt

Tournament statistics
- Matches played: 116
- Goals scored: 6,674 (57.53 per match)
- Top scorers: (Faroe Islands) Óli Mittún (87 goals)

Awards
- Best player: (Denmark) Frederik Emil Pedersen

The 2023 IHF Men's U19 Handball World Championship was the 10th edition of the IHF Men's U19 Handball World Championship, held from 2 to 13 August 2023 in Croatia under the aegis of International Handball Federation (IHF). It was the first time in history that the championship is organised by the Croatian Handball Federation.

Spain won their first title after defeating Denmark in the final.

== Bidding process ==
Two nations entered bid for hosting the tournament:

- Croatia
- Slovenia

Slovenia later withdrew their bid. The tournament was awarded to Croatia by IHF Council in its meeting held in Cairo, Egypt on 28 February 2020.

== Qualification ==
Event	Host	Dates	Vacancies	Qualified
IHF Council Meeting	(Egypt) Cairo	28 February 2020	1	Croatia
M18 EHF EURO 2022	(Montenegro) Podgorica	4–14 August 2022	11	Denmark; Faroe Islands; Germany; Hungary; Iceland; Montenegro; Norway; Portugal; Slovenia; Spain; Sweden
M18 EHF Championship 2022	(Israel) Tel Aviv	7–13 August 2022	1	Czech Republic
M18 EHF Championship 2022	(Latvia) Riga	8–14 August 2022	1	North Macedonia
M18 EHF Championship 2022	(Romania) Craiova	8–14 August 2022	1	Austria
2022 Asian Youth Championship	Bahrain	20–31 August 2022	5	Bahrain; Iran; Japan; Saudi Arabia; South Korea
2022 African Youth Championship	(Rwanda) Kigali	30 August – 6 September 2022	5	Algeria; Burundi; Egypt; Morocco; Rwanda
2022 South and Central American Youth Championship	(Argentina) Buenos Aires	8–12 November 2022	3	Argentina; Brazil; Chile
2022 North America and Caribbean Youth Championship	Mexico City	15–19 November 2022	2	Mexico; United States
2022 IHF Trophy Oceania	(Cook Islands) Rarotonga	5–9 December 2022	1	New Zealand
2023 IHF Inter-Continental Trophy	(Costa Rica) San José	7–11 March 2023	1	Georgia

== Draw ==
The draw took place on 3 March 2023 in Croatia.

Pot 1	Pot 2	Pot 3	Pot 4
Egypt; Spain; Sweden; Germany; Hungary; Denmark; Norway; Portugal	South Korea; Croatia; Faroe Islands; Iceland; Slovenia; Montenegro; Argentina; Austria	Rwanda; Iran; Saudi Arabia; North Macedonia; Japan; Brazil; Chile; Morocco	Mexico; Burundi; Algeria; Czech Republic; Bahrain; United States; New Zealand; Georgia (Note: Team not determined at time of draw)

== Referees ==
The referee pairs were selected on 21 June 2023.

Referees
Argentina	Santiago Correa; Agustin Conberse
Argentina/Egypt	Mariana García; Heidy El-Saied
Bosnia and Herzegovina	Tatjana Praštalo; Vesna Balvan
Brazil	Bruna Correa; Renata Correa
China	Zhou Yunlei; Cheng Yufeng
Croatia	Davor Lončar; Zoran Lončar
Cuba	Raymel Reyes; Alexis Zuñiga
Egypt	Alaa Emam; Hossam Hedaia

Referees
France	Yann Carmaux; Julien Mursch
Germany	Ramesh Thiyagarajah; Suresh Thiyagarajah
Hungary	Kristóf Altmár; Márton Horváth
Iraq	Khalid Hussein; Fadhil Imran
Japan	Hideki Furukawa; Tetsuro Murata
Kuwait	Maali Al-Enezi; Dalal Al-Nasem
Morocco	Mohamed Chouraki; Achraf El Mouniri

Referees
Moldova	Alexei Covalciuc; Igor Covalciuc
Montenegro	Jelena Vujačić; Anđelina Kažanegra
North Macedonia	Nenad Nikolovski; Ismailj Metalari
Senegal	Fadel Diop; Abdoulaye Faye
South Korea	Lee Ga-eul; Lee Eun-ha
Uruguay	Nicolás Perdomo; German Araújo
Uzbekistan	Khasan Ismoilov; Khusan Ismoilov

== Preliminary round ==
All times are local (UTC+2).

=== Group A ===
Pos	Team	Pld	W	D	L	GF	GA	GD	Pts	Qualification
1	Croatia (H)	3	3	0	0	134	64	+70	6	Main round
2	Portugal	3	2	0	1	118	81	+37	4	Main round
3	Algeria	3	1	0	2	71	110	−39	2	Presidents Cup
4	Rwanda	3	0	0	3	69	137	−68	0	Presidents Cup

Source: IHF
Rules for classification: 1) points; 2) head-to-head points; 3) head-to-head goal difference; 4) head-to-head number of goals scored; 5) goal difference.
(H) Hosts

2 August 2023; 13:00	Portugal	50–24	Rwanda	Varaždin Arena, Varaždin; Attendance: 60; Referees: García, El-Saied
2 August 2023; 13:00	Ferreira 9	(26–5)	Samuel 8	Varaždin Arena, Varaždin; Attendance: 60; Referees: García, El-Saied
2 August 2023; 13:00	5× (suspension)	Report	6× (suspension) 1× (red card)	Varaždin Arena, Varaždin; Attendance: 60; Referees: García, El-Saied

2 August 2023; 19:30	Croatia	42–19	Algeria	Varaždin Arena, Varaždin; Attendance: 600; Referees: Covalciuc, Covalciuc (MDA)
2 August 2023; 19:30	Ivanišević, Tkalec 7	(19–6)	Youcef, Zakaria 5	Varaždin Arena, Varaždin; Attendance: 600; Referees: Covalciuc, Covalciuc (MDA)
2 August 2023; 19:30	3× (suspension)	Report	4× (suspension)	Varaždin Arena, Varaždin; Attendance: 600; Referees: Covalciuc, Covalciuc (MDA)

4 August 2023; 15:30	Algeria	19–41	Portugal	Varaždin Arena, Varaždin; Attendance: 150; Referees: Ismoilov, Ismoilov (UZB)
4 August 2023; 15:30	Youcef 9	(8–15)	Oliveira 8	Varaždin Arena, Varaždin; Attendance: 150; Referees: Ismoilov, Ismoilov (UZB)
4 August 2023; 15:30	1× (yellow card) 9× (suspension)	Report	5× (suspension)	Varaždin Arena, Varaždin; Attendance: 150; Referees: Ismoilov, Ismoilov (UZB)

4 August 2023; 19:30	Croatia	54–18	Rwanda	Varaždin Arena, Varaždin; Attendance: 560; Referees: Reyes, Zuñiga (CUB)
4 August 2023; 19:30	Ivanišević 8	(25–9)	Samuel 5	Varaždin Arena, Varaždin; Attendance: 560; Referees: Reyes, Zuñiga (CUB)
4 August 2023; 19:30	1× (yellow card) 2× (suspension)	Report	2× (suspension)	Varaždin Arena, Varaždin; Attendance: 560; Referees: Reyes, Zuñiga (CUB)

5 August 2023; 15:30	Rwanda	27–33	Algeria	Varaždin Arena, Varaždin; Attendance: 175; Referees: Diop, Faye (SEN)
5 August 2023; 15:30	Samuel 8	(13–18)	Abdelouahab 10	Varaždin Arena, Varaždin; Attendance: 175; Referees: Diop, Faye (SEN)
5 August 2023; 15:30	1× (yellow card) 3× (suspension) 1× (red card)	Report	1× (yellow card) 5× (suspension)	Varaždin Arena, Varaždin; Attendance: 175; Referees: Diop, Faye (SEN)

5 August 2023; 19:30	Portugal	27–38	Croatia	Varaždin Arena, Varaždin; Attendance: 1,100; Referees: Correa, Conberse (ARG)
5 August 2023; 19:30	Sousa 7	(12–19)	Čaprić, Glivetić 8	Varaždin Arena, Varaždin; Attendance: 1,100; Referees: Correa, Conberse (ARG)
5 August 2023; 19:30	1× (yellow card) 6× (suspension)	Report	2× (yellow card) 4× (suspension)	Varaždin Arena, Varaždin; Attendance: 1,100; Referees: Correa, Conberse (ARG)

=== Group B ===
Pos	Team	Pld	W	D	L	GF	GA	GD	Pts	Qualification
1	Hungary	3	3	0	0	115	59	+56	6	Main round
2	Slovenia	3	2	0	1	123	60	+63	4	Main round
3	Morocco	3	1	0	2	91	93	−2	2	Presidents Cup
4	New Zealand	3	0	0	3	35	152	−117	0	Presidents Cup

Source: IHF
Rules for classification: 1) points; 2) head-to-head points; 3) head-to-head goal difference; 4) head-to-head number of goals scored; 5) goal difference.

2 August 2023; 15:00	Hungary	37–28	Morocco	Varaždin Arena, Varaždin; Attendance: 120; Referees: Reyes, Zuñiga (CUB)
2 August 2023; 15:00	Szepesi 8	(19–11)	Bilghoul, Razgui 6	Varaždin Arena, Varaždin; Attendance: 120; Referees: Reyes, Zuñiga (CUB)
2 August 2023; 15:00	1× (yellow card) 3× (suspension)	Report	3× (suspension)	Varaždin Arena, Varaždin; Attendance: 120; Referees: Reyes, Zuñiga (CUB)

2 August 2023; 17:00	Slovenia	60–11	New Zealand	Varaždin Arena, Varaždin; Attendance: 200; Referees: Diop, Faye (SEN)
2 August 2023; 17:00	Kačičnik 10	(30–3)	Whittaker 3	Varaždin Arena, Varaždin; Attendance: 200; Referees: Diop, Faye (SEN)
2 August 2023; 17:00	1× (yellow card) 5× (suspension)	Report	1× (suspension)	Varaždin Arena, Varaždin; Attendance: 200; Referees: Diop, Faye (SEN)

4 August 2023; 13:30	New Zealand	6–49	Hungary	Varaždin Arena, Varaždin; Attendance: 100; Referees: García, El-Saied
4 August 2023; 13:30	Pringot, Whittaker 2	(2–26)	Terjék 8	Varaždin Arena, Varaždin; Attendance: 100; Referees: García, El-Saied
4 August 2023; 13:30	2× (suspension)	Report	1× (yellow card) 2× (suspension)	Varaždin Arena, Varaždin; Attendance: 100; Referees: García, El-Saied

4 August 2023; 17:30	Slovenia	38–20	Morocco	Varaždin Arena, Varaždin; Attendance: 250; Referees: Zhou, Cheng (CHN)
4 August 2023; 17:30	Kačičnik 7	(17–7)	three players 4	Varaždin Arena, Varaždin; Attendance: 250; Referees: Zhou, Cheng (CHN)
4 August 2023; 17:30	1× (suspension) 1× (red card)	Report	4× (suspension) 1× (red card)	Varaždin Arena, Varaždin; Attendance: 250; Referees: Zhou, Cheng (CHN)

5 August 2023; 13:30	Morocco	43–18	New Zealand	Varaždin Arena, Varaždin; Attendance: 100; Referees: Al-Enezi, Al-Nasem (KUW)
5 August 2023; 13:30	Ilyasse 12	(21–7)	Pringot 7	Varaždin Arena, Varaždin; Attendance: 100; Referees: Al-Enezi, Al-Nasem (KUW)
5 August 2023; 13:30	3× (suspension)	Report	1× (suspension)	Varaždin Arena, Varaždin; Attendance: 100; Referees: Al-Enezi, Al-Nasem (KUW)

5 August 2023; 17:30	Hungary	29–25	Slovenia	Varaždin Arena, Varaždin; Attendance: 550; Referees: Perdomo, Araújo (URU)
5 August 2023; 17:30	Csörgő 8	(14–14)	Mlivič 6	Varaždin Arena, Varaždin; Attendance: 550; Referees: Perdomo, Araújo (URU)
5 August 2023; 17:30	1× (yellow card) 5× (suspension) 1× (red card)	Report	6× (suspension) 1× (red card)	Varaždin Arena, Varaždin; Attendance: 550; Referees: Perdomo, Araújo (URU)

=== Group C ===
Pos	Team	Pld	W	D	L	GF	GA	GD	Pts	Qualification
1	Egypt	3	3	0	0	101	84	+17	6	Main round
2	Czech Republic	3	2	0	1	81	81	0	4	Main round
3	Iceland	3	1	0	2	92	90	+2	2	Presidents Cup
4	Japan	3	0	0	3	86	105	−19	0	Presidents Cup

Source: IHF
Rules for classification: 1) points; 2) head-to-head points; 3) head-to-head goal difference; 4) head-to-head number of goals scored; 5) goal difference.

2 August 2023; 13:30	Egypt	40–32	Japan	Josip Samardžija-Bepo, Koprivnica; Attendance: 100; Referees: Ismoilov, Ismoilov (UZB)
2 August 2023; 13:30	El-Sayed 6	(21–16)	Tachibana 8	Josip Samardžija-Bepo, Koprivnica; Attendance: 100; Referees: Ismoilov, Ismoilov (UZB)
2 August 2023; 13:30	5× (suspension)	Report	2× (suspension)	Josip Samardžija-Bepo, Koprivnica; Attendance: 100; Referees: Ismoilov, Ismoilov (UZB)

2 August 2023; 15:30	Iceland	27–29	Czech Republic	Josip Samardžija-Bepo, Koprivnica; Attendance: 150; Referees: Carmaux, Mursch (FRA)
2 August 2023; 15:30	three players 4	(10–12)	Flajsar 6	Josip Samardžija-Bepo, Koprivnica; Attendance: 150; Referees: Carmaux, Mursch (FRA)
2 August 2023; 15:30	1× (yellow card) 4× (suspension)	Report	3× (suspension)	Josip Samardžija-Bepo, Koprivnica; Attendance: 150; Referees: Carmaux, Mursch (FRA)

3 August 2023; 13:30	Czech Republic	22–28	Egypt	Josip Samardžija-Bepo, Koprivnica; Attendance: 100; Referees: Correa, Conberse (ARG)
3 August 2023; 13:30	Erebai 6	(8–14)	Masoud 7	Josip Samardžija-Bepo, Koprivnica; Attendance: 100; Referees: Correa, Conberse (ARG)
3 August 2023; 13:30	1× (yellow card) 4× (suspension)	Report	1× (yellow card) 6× (suspension)	Josip Samardžija-Bepo, Koprivnica; Attendance: 100; Referees: Correa, Conberse (ARG)

3 August 2023; 15:30	Iceland	35–28	Japan	Josip Samardžija-Bepo, Koprivnica; Attendance: 150; Referees: Al-Enezi, Al-Nasem (KUW)
3 August 2023; 15:30	Haraldsson 5	(13–10)	three players 4	Josip Samardžija-Bepo, Koprivnica; Attendance: 150; Referees: Al-Enezi, Al-Nasem (KUW)
3 August 2023; 15:30	1× (yellow card) 8× (suspension)	Report	1× (suspension)	Josip Samardžija-Bepo, Koprivnica; Attendance: 150; Referees: Al-Enezi, Al-Nasem (KUW)

5 August 2023; 13:30	Japan	26–30	Czech Republic	Josip Samardžija-Bepo, Koprivnica; Attendance: 150; Referees: Vujačić, Kažanegra (MNE)
5 August 2023; 13:30	Hasegawa, Tachibana 5	(15–13)	Jonáš 7	Josip Samardžija-Bepo, Koprivnica; Attendance: 150; Referees: Vujačić, Kažanegra (MNE)
5 August 2023; 13:30	1× (yellow card) 3× (suspension)	Report	1× (yellow card) 2× (suspension)	Josip Samardžija-Bepo, Koprivnica; Attendance: 150; Referees: Vujačić, Kažanegra (MNE)

5 August 2023; 15:30	Egypt	33–30	Iceland	Josip Samardžija-Bepo, Koprivnica; Attendance: 200; Referees: Covalciuc, Covalciuc (MDA)
5 August 2023; 15:30	Hashad 6	(14–15)	Stefánsson 9	Josip Samardžija-Bepo, Koprivnica; Attendance: 200; Referees: Covalciuc, Covalciuc (MDA)
5 August 2023; 15:30	5× (suspension) 2× (red card)	Report	1× (yellow card) 7× (suspension) 1× (red card)	Josip Samardžija-Bepo, Koprivnica; Attendance: 200; Referees: Covalciuc, Covalciuc (MDA)

=== Group D ===
Pos	Team	Pld	W	D	L	GF	GA	GD	Pts	Qualification
1	Spain	3	3	0	0	105	69	+36	6	Main round
2	Brazil	3	2	0	1	88	90	−2	4	Main round
3	Bahrain	3	1	0	2	72	85	−13	2	Presidents Cup
4	South Korea	3	0	0	3	80	101	−21	0	Presidents Cup

Source: IHF
Rules for classification: 1) points; 2) head-to-head points; 3) head-to-head goal difference; 4) head-to-head number of goals scored; 5) goal difference.

2 August 2023; 17:30	Spain	38–29	Brazil	Josip Samardžija-Bepo, Koprivnica; Attendance: 100; Referees: Vujačić, Kažanegra (MNE)
2 August 2023; 17:30	Romero 9	(18–17)	Candido, Da Silva 7	Josip Samardžija-Bepo, Koprivnica; Attendance: 100; Referees: Vujačić, Kažanegra (MNE)
2 August 2023; 17:30	2× (yellow card) 1× (suspension)	Report	1× (yellow card) 8× (suspension)	Josip Samardžija-Bepo, Koprivnica; Attendance: 100; Referees: Vujačić, Kažanegra (MNE)

2 August 2023; 19:30	South Korea	28–32	Bahrain	Josip Samardžija-Bepo, Koprivnica; Attendance: 100; Referees: Perdomo, Araújo (URU)
2 August 2023; 19:30	Choi, Moon 7	(13–14)	Farsan 9	Josip Samardžija-Bepo, Koprivnica; Attendance: 100; Referees: Perdomo, Araújo (URU)
2 August 2023; 19:30	2× (suspension)	Report	2× (suspension)	Josip Samardžija-Bepo, Koprivnica; Attendance: 100; Referees: Perdomo, Araújo (URU)

3 August 2023; 17:30	Bahrain	18–29	Spain	Josip Samardžija-Bepo, Koprivnica; Attendance: 150; Referees: Zhou, Cheng (CHN)
3 August 2023; 17:30	Mohamed 4	(8–15)	Romero 6	Josip Samardžija-Bepo, Koprivnica; Attendance: 150; Referees: Zhou, Cheng (CHN)
3 August 2023; 17:30	1× (suspension)	Report	1× (yellow card) 3× (suspension)	Josip Samardžija-Bepo, Koprivnica; Attendance: 150; Referees: Zhou, Cheng (CHN)

3 August 2023; 19:30	South Korea	30–31	Brazil	Josip Samardžija-Bepo, Koprivnica; Attendance: 100; Referees: Diop, Faye (SEN)
3 August 2023; 19:30	Moon 10	(15–16)	Candido 9	Josip Samardžija-Bepo, Koprivnica; Attendance: 100; Referees: Diop, Faye (SEN)
3 August 2023; 19:30	1× (suspension)	Report	1× (yellow card) 9× (suspension)	Josip Samardžija-Bepo, Koprivnica; Attendance: 100; Referees: Diop, Faye (SEN)

5 August 2023; 17:30	Brazil	28–22	Bahrain	Josip Samardžija-Bepo, Koprivnica; Attendance: 100; Referees: Carmaux, Mursch (FRA)
5 August 2023; 17:30	Pertoldo, Perin 5	(14–13)	Ali 6	Josip Samardžija-Bepo, Koprivnica; Attendance: 100; Referees: Carmaux, Mursch (FRA)
5 August 2023; 17:30	2× (suspension)	Report	2× (suspension)	Josip Samardžija-Bepo, Koprivnica; Attendance: 100; Referees: Carmaux, Mursch (FRA)

5 August 2023; 19:30	Spain	38–22	South Korea	Josip Samardžija-Bepo, Koprivnica; Attendance: 100; Referees: García, El-Saied
5 August 2023; 19:30	González 7	(17–12)	Moon, Son 4	Josip Samardžija-Bepo, Koprivnica; Attendance: 100; Referees: García, El-Saied
5 August 2023; 19:30	3× (suspension)	Report	1× (yellow card) 3× (suspension)	Josip Samardžija-Bepo, Koprivnica; Attendance: 100; Referees: García, El-Saied

=== Group E ===
Pos	Team	Pld	W	D	L	GF	GA	GD	Pts	Qualification
1	Denmark	3	3	0	0	124	70	+54	6	Main round
2	Austria	3	2	0	1	118	80	+38	4	Main round
3	Chile	3	1	0	2	62	101	−39	2	Presidents Cup
4	Mexico	3	0	0	3	75	128	−53	0	Presidents Cup

Source: IHF
Rules for classification: 1) points; 2) head-to-head points; 3) head-to-head goal difference; 4) head-to-head number of goals scored; 5) goal difference.

2 August 2023; 13:30	Denmark	32–21	Chile	Centar Zamet, Rijeka; Attendance: 300; Referees: Furukawa, Murata (JPN)
2 August 2023; 13:30	Pedersen 6	(16–12)	Hernández 4	Centar Zamet, Rijeka; Attendance: 300; Referees: Furukawa, Murata (JPN)
2 August 2023; 13:30	1× (yellow card) 3× (suspension)	Report	1× (yellow card) 2× (suspension)	Centar Zamet, Rijeka; Attendance: 300; Referees: Furukawa, Murata (JPN)

2 August 2023; 15:30	Austria	49–26	Mexico	Centar Zamet, Rijeka; Attendance: 500; Referees: Praštalo, Balvan (BIH)
2 August 2023; 15:30	Huber 11	(21–10)	Anguiano, García 7	Centar Zamet, Rijeka; Attendance: 500; Referees: Praštalo, Balvan (BIH)
2 August 2023; 15:30	6× (suspension)	Report	2× (suspension)	Centar Zamet, Rijeka; Attendance: 500; Referees: Praštalo, Balvan (BIH)

4 August 2023; 13:30	Mexico	21–49	Denmark	Centar Zamet, Rijeka; Attendance: 80; Referees: Lee, Lee (KOR)
4 August 2023; 13:30	Morales, Gámez 4	(8–26)	Pedersen 8	Centar Zamet, Rijeka; Attendance: 80; Referees: Lee, Lee (KOR)
4 August 2023; 13:30	2× (suspension)	Report	1× (yellow card)	Centar Zamet, Rijeka; Attendance: 80; Referees: Lee, Lee (KOR)

4 August 2023; 15:30	Austria	41–11	Chile	Centar Zamet, Rijeka; Attendance: 100; Referees: Lončar, Lončar (CRO)
4 August 2023; 15:30	Böhm 7	(19–3)	three players 2	Centar Zamet, Rijeka; Attendance: 100; Referees: Lončar, Lončar (CRO)
4 August 2023; 15:30	3× (suspension)	Report	3× (suspension)	Centar Zamet, Rijeka; Attendance: 100; Referees: Lončar, Lončar (CRO)

5 August 2023; 13:30	Chile	30–28	Mexico	Centar Zamet, Rijeka; Attendance: 60; Referees: Thiyagarajah, Thiyagarajah (GER)
5 August 2023; 13:30	Castillo 7	(19–12)	Anguiano 7	Centar Zamet, Rijeka; Attendance: 60; Referees: Thiyagarajah, Thiyagarajah (GER)
5 August 2023; 13:30	1× (yellow card) 2× (suspension)	Report	2× (suspension)	Centar Zamet, Rijeka; Attendance: 60; Referees: Thiyagarajah, Thiyagarajah (GER)

5 August 2023; 15:30	Denmark	43–28	Austria	Centar Zamet, Rijeka; Attendance: 110; Referees: Correa, Correa (BRA)
5 August 2023; 15:30	Pedersen 8	(21–15)	Böhm 5	Centar Zamet, Rijeka; Attendance: 110; Referees: Correa, Correa (BRA)
5 August 2023; 15:30	1× (yellow card) 1× (suspension)	Report	4× (suspension)	Centar Zamet, Rijeka; Attendance: 110; Referees: Correa, Correa (BRA)

=== Group F ===
Pos	Team	Pld	W	D	L	GF	GA	GD	Pts	Qualification
1	Norway	3	3	0	0	106	71	+35	6	Main round
2	North Macedonia	3	2	0	1	81	68	+13	4	Main round
3	Montenegro	3	1	0	2	75	89	−14	2	Presidents Cup
4	Georgia	3	0	0	3	64	99	−35	0	Presidents Cup

Source: IHF
Rules for classification: 1) points; 2) head-to-head points; 3) head-to-head goal difference; 4) head-to-head number of goals scored; 5) goal difference.

2 August 2023; 17:30	Norway	27–25	North Macedonia	Centar Zamet, Rijeka; Attendance: 628; Referees: Thiyagarajah, Thiyagarajah (GER)
2 August 2023; 17:30	Olseth 9	(11–9)	Kalajdjieski 7	Centar Zamet, Rijeka; Attendance: 628; Referees: Thiyagarajah, Thiyagarajah (GER)
2 August 2023; 17:30	3× (suspension)	Report	2× (yellow card) 7× (suspension) 2× (red card)	Centar Zamet, Rijeka; Attendance: 628; Referees: Thiyagarajah, Thiyagarajah (GER)

2 August 2023; 19:30	Montenegro	34–19	Georgia	Centar Zamet, Rijeka; Attendance: 300; Referees: Hussein, Imran (IRQ)
2 August 2023; 19:30	Đurković 9	(16–11)	Darsania 6	Centar Zamet, Rijeka; Attendance: 300; Referees: Hussein, Imran (IRQ)
2 August 2023; 19:30	1× (yellow card) 3× (suspension)	Report	1× (yellow card) 2× (suspension)	Centar Zamet, Rijeka; Attendance: 300; Referees: Hussein, Imran (IRQ)

4 August 2023; 17:30	Georgia	24–38	Norway	Centar Zamet, Rijeka; Attendance: 150; Referees: Furukawa, Murata (JPN)
4 August 2023; 17:30	Areshidze, Shervashidze 4	(8–20)	Solost 8	Centar Zamet, Rijeka; Attendance: 150; Referees: Furukawa, Murata (JPN)
4 August 2023; 17:30	5× (suspension)	Report	3× (suspension)	Centar Zamet, Rijeka; Attendance: 150; Referees: Furukawa, Murata (JPN)

4 August 2023; 19:30	Montenegro	20–29	North Macedonia	Centar Zamet, Rijeka; Attendance: 150; Referees: Emam, Hedaia (EGY)
4 August 2023; 19:30	Dobrković 7	(10–12)	five players 3	Centar Zamet, Rijeka; Attendance: 150; Referees: Emam, Hedaia (EGY)
4 August 2023; 19:30	2× (yellow card) 7× (suspension)	Report	1× (yellow card) 5× (suspension) 1× (red card)	Centar Zamet, Rijeka; Attendance: 150; Referees: Emam, Hedaia (EGY)

5 August 2023; 17:30	North Macedonia	27–21	Georgia	Centar Zamet, Rijeka; Attendance: 90; Referees: Chouraki, El Mouniri (MAR)
5 August 2023; 17:30	Belistojanovski, Subashevski 6	(13–10)	Darsania 9	Centar Zamet, Rijeka; Attendance: 90; Referees: Chouraki, El Mouniri (MAR)
5 August 2023; 17:30	2× (suspension)	Report	2× (yellow card) 2× (suspension)	Centar Zamet, Rijeka; Attendance: 90; Referees: Chouraki, El Mouniri (MAR)

5 August 2023; 19:30	Norway	41–22	Montenegro	Centar Zamet, Rijeka; Attendance: 100; Referees: Altmár, Horváth (HUN)
5 August 2023; 19:30	Lid 7	(22–10)	Bakić 4	Centar Zamet, Rijeka; Attendance: 100; Referees: Altmár, Horváth (HUN)
5 August 2023; 19:30	1× (yellow card)	Report	6× (suspension)	Centar Zamet, Rijeka; Attendance: 100; Referees: Altmár, Horváth (HUN)

=== Group G ===
Pos	Team	Pld	W	D	L	GF	GA	GD	Pts	Qualification
1	Germany	3	3	0	0	110	57	+53	6	Main round
2	Saudi Arabia	3	1	1	1	98	80	+18	3	Main round
3	Argentina	3	1	1	1	78	77	+1	3	Presidents Cup
4	United States	3	0	0	3	50	122	−72	0	Presidents Cup

Source: IHF
Rules for classification: 1) points; 2) head-to-head points; 3) head-to-head goal difference; 4) head-to-head number of goals scored; 5) goal difference.

2 August 2023; 13:00	Germany	37–26	Saudi Arabia	Sports Hall Marino Cvetković, Opatija; Attendance: 150; Referees: Nikolovski, Metalari (MKD)
2 August 2023; 13:00	Siemer 8	(18–13)	Al-Turki 6	Sports Hall Marino Cvetković, Opatija; Attendance: 150; Referees: Nikolovski, Metalari (MKD)
2 August 2023; 13:00	2× (yellow card) 6× (suspension)	Report	1× (yellow card) 4× (suspension)	Sports Hall Marino Cvetković, Opatija; Attendance: 150; Referees: Nikolovski, Metalari (MKD)

2 August 2023; 15:00	Argentina	33–21	United States	Sports Hall Marino Cvetković, Opatija; Referees: Lee, Lee (KOR)
2 August 2023; 15:00	Barceló, Obregón 5	(20–10)	Kuhlmeyer, McCauley 5	Sports Hall Marino Cvetković, Opatija; Referees: Lee, Lee (KOR)
2 August 2023; 15:00	3× (suspension)	Report	1× (suspension)	Sports Hall Marino Cvetković, Opatija; Referees: Lee, Lee (KOR)

3 August 2023; 13:00	United States	15–46	Germany	Sports Hall Marino Cvetković, Opatija; Attendance: 250; Referees: Chouraki, El Mouniri (MAR)
3 August 2023; 13:00	Gallittu 4	(7–21)	Gömmel, Siemer 9	Sports Hall Marino Cvetković, Opatija; Attendance: 250; Referees: Chouraki, El Mouniri (MAR)
3 August 2023; 13:00		Report	2× (yellow card) 4× (suspension)	Sports Hall Marino Cvetković, Opatija; Attendance: 250; Referees: Chouraki, El Mouniri (MAR)

3 August 2023; 15:00	Argentina	29–29	Saudi Arabia	Sports Hall Marino Cvetković, Opatija; Attendance: 130; Referees: Lončar, Lončar (CRO)
3 August 2023; 15:00	Obregón 10	(13–14)	Al-Fardan, Furaij 6	Sports Hall Marino Cvetković, Opatija; Attendance: 130; Referees: Lončar, Lončar (CRO)
3 August 2023; 15:00	1× (yellow card) 3× (suspension) 1× (red card)	Report	1× (yellow card) 8× (suspension) 2× (red card)	Sports Hall Marino Cvetković, Opatija; Attendance: 130; Referees: Lončar, Lončar (CRO)

5 August 2023; 13:00	Saudi Arabia	43–14	United States	Sports Hall Marino Cvetković, Opatija; Attendance: 200; Referees: Praštalo, Balvan (BIH)
5 August 2023; 13:00	Furaij 15	(22–7)	Edwards 5	Sports Hall Marino Cvetković, Opatija; Attendance: 200; Referees: Praštalo, Balvan (BIH)
5 August 2023; 13:00	4× (suspension)	Report	7× (suspension)	Sports Hall Marino Cvetković, Opatija; Attendance: 200; Referees: Praštalo, Balvan (BIH)

5 August 2023; 15:00	Germany	27–16	Argentina	Sports Hall Marino Cvetković, Opatija; Attendance: 300; Referees: Emam, Hedaia (EGY)
5 August 2023; 15:00	Haake 6	(13–5)	Ojea 5	Sports Hall Marino Cvetković, Opatija; Attendance: 300; Referees: Emam, Hedaia (EGY)
5 August 2023; 15:00	3× (yellow card) 3× (suspension)	Report	1× (suspension)	Sports Hall Marino Cvetković, Opatija; Attendance: 300; Referees: Emam, Hedaia (EGY)

=== Group H ===
Pos	Team	Pld	W	D	L	GF	GA	GD	Pts	Qualification
1	Iran	3	2	1	0	101	77	+24	5	Main round
2	Faroe Islands	3	2	0	1	114	81	+33	4	Main round
3	Sweden	3	1	1	1	119	76	+43	3	Presidents Cup
4	Burundi	3	0	0	3	61	161	−100	0	Presidents Cup

Source: IHF
Rules for classification: 1) points; 2) head-to-head points; 3) head-to-head goal difference; 4) head-to-head number of goals scored; 5) goal difference.

2 August 2023; 17:00	Sweden	26–26	Iran	Sports Hall Marino Cvetković, Opatija; Attendance: 110; Referees: Altmár, Horváth (HUN)
2 August 2023; 17:00	Månsson 7	(12–9)	Karami 9	Sports Hall Marino Cvetković, Opatija; Attendance: 110; Referees: Altmár, Horváth (HUN)
2 August 2023; 17:00	1× (yellow card) 1× (suspension)	Report	6× (suspension) 1× (red card)	Sports Hall Marino Cvetković, Opatija; Attendance: 110; Referees: Altmár, Horváth (HUN)

2 August 2023; 19:00	Faroe Islands	53–21	Burundi	Sports Hall Marino Cvetković, Opatija; Referees: Correa, Correa (BRA)
2 August 2023; 19:00	Mittún 11	(30–8)	Benin 6	Sports Hall Marino Cvetković, Opatija; Referees: Correa, Correa (BRA)
2 August 2023; 19:00	1× (suspension)	Report	6× (suspension) 1× (red card)	Sports Hall Marino Cvetković, Opatija; Referees: Correa, Correa (BRA)

3 August 2023; 17:00	Burundi	16–62	Sweden	Sports Hall Marino Cvetković, Opatija; Attendance: 150; Referees: Hussein, Imran (IRQ)
3 August 2023; 17:00	Bernard 6	(4–31)	Hasanic, Sundewall 10	Sports Hall Marino Cvetković, Opatija; Attendance: 150; Referees: Hussein, Imran (IRQ)
3 August 2023; 17:00	1× (yellow card) 4× (suspension) 1× (red card)	Report	2× (suspension)	Sports Hall Marino Cvetković, Opatija; Attendance: 150; Referees: Hussein, Imran (IRQ)

3 August 2023; 19:00	Faroe Islands	27–29	Iran	Sports Hall Marino Cvetković, Opatija; Attendance: 300; Referees: Emam, Hedaia (EGY)
3 August 2023; 19:00	Mittún 9	(13–9)	Moradi 8	Sports Hall Marino Cvetković, Opatija; Attendance: 300; Referees: Emam, Hedaia (EGY)
3 August 2023; 19:00	2× (suspension)	Report	2× (yellow card) 5× (suspension)	Sports Hall Marino Cvetković, Opatija; Attendance: 300; Referees: Emam, Hedaia (EGY)

5 August 2023; 17:00	Iran	46–24	Burundi	Sports Hall Marino Cvetković, Opatija; Attendance: 100; Referees: Lončar, Lončar (CRO)
5 August 2023; 17:00	Karami 14	(24–13)	Benin 8	Sports Hall Marino Cvetković, Opatija; Attendance: 100; Referees: Lončar, Lončar (CRO)
5 August 2023; 17:00	1× (suspension)	Report	1× (yellow card) 4× (suspension)	Sports Hall Marino Cvetković, Opatija; Attendance: 100; Referees: Lončar, Lončar (CRO)

5 August 2023; 19:00	Sweden	31–34	Faroe Islands	Sports Hall Marino Cvetković, Opatija; Attendance: 300; Referees: Nikolovski, Metalari (MKD)
5 August 2023; 19:00	Starck 6	(14–14)	Mittún 17	Sports Hall Marino Cvetković, Opatija; Attendance: 300; Referees: Nikolovski, Metalari (MKD)
5 August 2023; 19:00	1× (yellow card) 3× (suspension)	Report	3× (suspension)	Sports Hall Marino Cvetković, Opatija; Attendance: 300; Referees: Nikolovski, Metalari (MKD)

== President's Cup ==
Points obtained in the matches against the team from the group are taken over.

=== Group I ===
Pos	Team	Pld	W	D	L	GF	GA	GD	Pts	Qualification
1	Morocco	3	2	0	1	101	73	+28	4 (Note: Morocco 2 Pts, +3 GD; Algeria 2 Pts, +2 GD; Rwanda 2 Pts, −5 GD)	17–20th places
2	Algeria	3	2	0	1	94	67	+27	4	21st–24th places
3	Rwanda	3	2	0	1	104	82	+22	4	25–28th places
4	New Zealand	3	0	0	3	49	126	−77	0	29th–32nd places

Source: IHF
Rules for classification: 1) points; 2) head-to-head points; 3) head-to-head goal difference; 4) head-to-head number of goals scored; 5) goal difference.
Notes:

7 August 2023; 13:30	Algeria	39–14	New Zealand	Varaždin Arena, Varaždin; Attendance: 75; Referees: Cheng, Zhou (CHN)
7 August 2023; 13:30	Abdelouahab 7	(22–4)	Bruce-Campbell 4	Varaždin Arena, Varaždin; Attendance: 75; Referees: Cheng, Zhou (CHN)
7 August 2023; 13:30	1× (yellow card) 5× (suspension)	Report	2× (suspension)	Varaždin Arena, Varaždin; Attendance: 75; Referees: Cheng, Zhou (CHN)

7 August 2023; 15:30	Morocco	32–33	Rwanda	Varaždin Arena, Varaždin; Attendance: 100; Referees: Reyes, Zuñiga (CUB)
7 August 2023; 15:30	Razgui 8	(17–16)	Yves 8	Varaždin Arena, Varaždin; Attendance: 100; Referees: Reyes, Zuñiga (CUB)
7 August 2023; 15:30	3× (suspension)	Report	3× (suspension)	Varaždin Arena, Varaždin; Attendance: 100; Referees: Reyes, Zuñiga (CUB)

8 August 2023; 13:30	Rwanda	44–17	New Zealand	Varaždin Arena, Varaždin; Attendance: 75; Referees: Ismoilov, Ismoilov (UZB)
8 August 2023; 13:30	Yves 14	(17–9)	Clarke 5	Varaždin Arena, Varaždin; Attendance: 75; Referees: Ismoilov, Ismoilov (UZB)
8 August 2023; 13:30	4× (suspension)	Report		Varaždin Arena, Varaždin; Attendance: 75; Referees: Ismoilov, Ismoilov (UZB)

8 August 2023; 15:30	Algeria	22–26	Morocco	Varaždin Arena, Varaždin; Attendance: 75; Referees: Covalciuc, Covalciuc (MDA)
8 August 2023; 15:30	Abdelouahab 8	(10–12)	Razgui 7	Varaždin Arena, Varaždin; Attendance: 75; Referees: Covalciuc, Covalciuc (MDA)
8 August 2023; 15:30	1× (yellow card) 6× (suspension) 1× (red card)	Report	5× (suspension)	Varaždin Arena, Varaždin; Attendance: 75; Referees: Covalciuc, Covalciuc (MDA)

=== Group II ===
Pos	Team	Pld	W	D	L	GF	GA	GD	Pts	Qualification
1	Iceland	3	3	0	0	107	79	+28	6	17–20th places
2	Japan	3	1	0	2	88	90	−2	2 (Note: Japan 2 Pts, +5 GD; South Korea 2 Pts, +3 GD; Bahrain 2 Pts, −8 GD)	21st–24th places
3	South Korea	3	1	0	2	85	97	−12	2	25–28th places
4	Bahrain	3	1	0	2	81	95	−14	2	29th–32nd places

Source: IHF
Rules for classification: 1) points; 2) head-to-head points; 3) head-to-head goal difference; 4) head-to-head number of goals scored; 5) goal difference.
Notes:

7 August 2023; 13:30	Iceland	38–23	South Korea	Josip Samardžija-Bepo, Koprivnica; Attendance: 100; Referees: Hussein, Imran (IRQ)
7 August 2023; 13:30	Heiðarsson 6	(18–13)	Moon 6	Josip Samardžija-Bepo, Koprivnica; Attendance: 100; Referees: Hussein, Imran (IRQ)
7 August 2023; 13:30	4× (suspension)	Report		Josip Samardžija-Bepo, Koprivnica; Attendance: 100; Referees: Hussein, Imran (IRQ)

7 August 2023; 15:30	Bahrain	21–33	Japan	Josip Samardžija-Bepo, Koprivnica; Attendance: 50; Referees: García, El-Saied
7 August 2023; 15:30	Farsan 5	(10–13)	Furukawa 6	Josip Samardžija-Bepo, Koprivnica; Attendance: 50; Referees: García, El-Saied
7 August 2023; 15:30	1× (suspension)	Report	1× (yellow card) 3× (suspension)	Josip Samardžija-Bepo, Koprivnica; Attendance: 50; Referees: García, El-Saied

8 August 2023; 13:30	Japan	27–34	South Korea	Josip Samardžija-Bepo, Koprivnica; Attendance: 50; Referees: Diop, Faye (SEN)
8 August 2023; 13:30	Tachibana 8	(10–19)	Choi 8	Josip Samardžija-Bepo, Koprivnica; Attendance: 50; Referees: Diop, Faye (SEN)
8 August 2023; 13:30	1× (yellow card) 2× (suspension)	Report	2× (suspension)	Josip Samardžija-Bepo, Koprivnica; Attendance: 50; Referees: Diop, Faye (SEN)

8 August 2023; 15:30	Iceland	34–28	Bahrain	Josip Samardžija-Bepo, Koprivnica; Attendance: 100; Referees: Zhou, Cheng (CHN)
8 August 2023; 15:30	Stefánsson 6	(19–13)	Mohamed 6	Josip Samardžija-Bepo, Koprivnica; Attendance: 100; Referees: Zhou, Cheng (CHN)
8 August 2023; 15:30	7× (suspension)	Report	1× (yellow card) 2× (suspension)	Josip Samardžija-Bepo, Koprivnica; Attendance: 100; Referees: Zhou, Cheng (CHN)

=== Group III ===
Pos	Team	Pld	W	D	L	GF	GA	GD	Pts	Qualification
1	Montenegro	3	3	0	0	86	67	+19	6	17–20th places
2	Chile	3	2	0	1	85	77	+8	4	21st–24th places
3	Georgia	3	1	0	2	85	90	−5	2	25–28th places
4	Mexico	3	0	0	3	77	99	−22	0	29th–32nd places

Source: IHF
Rules for classification: 1) points; 2) head-to-head points; 3) head-to-head goal difference; 4) head-to-head number of goals scored; 5) goal difference.

7 August 2023; 13:30	Chile	34–25	Georgia	Centar Zamet, Rijeka; Attendance: 25; Referees: Lee, Lee (KOR)
7 August 2023; 13:30	Castillo, Hernández 7	(14–9)	Darsania 9	Centar Zamet, Rijeka; Attendance: 25; Referees: Lee, Lee (KOR)
7 August 2023; 13:30	3× (suspension)	Report	1× (yellow card) 5× (suspension)	Centar Zamet, Rijeka; Attendance: 25; Referees: Lee, Lee (KOR)

7 August 2023; 15:30	Montenegro	28–27	Mexico	Centar Zamet, Rijeka; Attendance: 50; Referees: Furukawa, Murata (JPN)
7 August 2023; 15:30	Bakić 6	(12–15)	Anguiano 6	Centar Zamet, Rijeka; Attendance: 50; Referees: Furukawa, Murata (JPN)
7 August 2023; 15:30	7× (suspension)	Report	1× (yellow card) 3× (suspension)	Centar Zamet, Rijeka; Attendance: 50; Referees: Furukawa, Murata (JPN)

8 August 2023; 13:30	Mexico	22–41	Georgia	Centar Zamet, Rijeka; Attendance: 40; Referees: Emam, Hedaia (EGY)
8 August 2023; 13:30	Anguiano 7	(8–20)	Khelisupali 9	Centar Zamet, Rijeka; Attendance: 40; Referees: Emam, Hedaia (EGY)
8 August 2023; 13:30	4× (suspension)	Report	1× (yellow card) 3× (suspension)	Centar Zamet, Rijeka; Attendance: 40; Referees: Emam, Hedaia (EGY)

8 August 2023; 15:30	Chile	21–24	Montenegro	Centar Zamet, Rijeka; Attendance: 40; Referees: Altmár, Horváth (HUN)
8 August 2023; 15:30	Castillo 6	(10–13)	Bakić, Đurković 6	Centar Zamet, Rijeka; Attendance: 40; Referees: Altmár, Horváth (HUN)
8 August 2023; 15:30	2× (suspension)	Report	3× (suspension)	Centar Zamet, Rijeka; Attendance: 40; Referees: Altmár, Horváth (HUN)

=== Group IV ===
Pos	Team	Pld	W	D	L	GF	GA	GD	Pts	Qualification
1	Sweden	3	3	0	0	154	62	+92	6	17–20th places
2	Argentina	3	2	0	1	101	88	+13	4	21st–24th places
3	United States	3	1	0	2	71	109	−38	2	25–28th places
4	Burundi	3	0	0	3	67	134	−67	0	29th–32nd places

Source: IHF
Rules for classification: 1) points; 2) head-to-head points; 3) head-to-head goal difference; 4) head-to-head number of goals scored; 5) goal difference.

7 August 2023; 13:00	Argentina	39–25	Burundi	Sports Hall Marino Cvetković, Opatija; Attendance: 80; Referees: Metalari, Nikolovski (MKD)
7 August 2023; 13:00	Rodríguez 12	(16–14)	Ferdinand 8	Sports Hall Marino Cvetković, Opatija; Attendance: 80; Referees: Metalari, Nikolovski (MKD)
7 August 2023; 13:00	3× (suspension)	Report	6× (suspension)	Sports Hall Marino Cvetković, Opatija; Attendance: 80; Referees: Metalari, Nikolovski (MKD)

7 August 2023; 15:00	Sweden	50–17	United States	Sports Hall Marino Cvetković, Opatija; Attendance: 110; Referees: Chouraki, El Mouniri (MAR)
7 August 2023; 15:00	Gustavsson 9	(24–10)	Fernandez 7	Sports Hall Marino Cvetković, Opatija; Attendance: 110; Referees: Chouraki, El Mouniri (MAR)
7 August 2023; 15:00	1× (yellow card) 3× (suspension)	Report		Sports Hall Marino Cvetković, Opatija; Attendance: 110; Referees: Chouraki, El Mouniri (MAR)

8 August 2023; 13:00	United States	33–26	Burundi	Sports Hall Marino Cvetković, Opatija; Attendance: 100; Referees: Lee, Lee (KOR)
8 August 2023; 13:00	Edwards 11	(15–14)	Bernard 6	Sports Hall Marino Cvetković, Opatija; Attendance: 100; Referees: Lee, Lee (KOR)
8 August 2023; 13:00	3× (suspension)	Report	5× (suspension) 1× (red card)	Sports Hall Marino Cvetković, Opatija; Attendance: 100; Referees: Lee, Lee (KOR)

8 August 2023; 15:00	Argentina	29–42	Sweden	Sports Hall Marino Cvetković, Opatija; Attendance: 100; Referees: Praštalo, Balvan (BIH)
8 August 2023; 15:00	Ojea 8	(19–21)	four players 6	Sports Hall Marino Cvetković, Opatija; Attendance: 100; Referees: Praštalo, Balvan (BIH)
8 August 2023; 15:00	6× (suspension) 1× (red card)	Report	3× (suspension)	Sports Hall Marino Cvetković, Opatija; Attendance: 100; Referees: Praštalo, Balvan (BIH)

== Main round ==
Points obtained in the matches against the team from the group are taken over.

=== Group I ===
Pos	Team	Pld	W	D	L	GF	GA	GD	Pts	Qualification
1	Croatia (H)	3	2	1	0	98	80	+18	5	Quarterfinals
2	Portugal	3	2	0	1	86	92	−6	4	Quarterfinals
3	Hungary	3	1	1	1	85	84	+1	3	9–12th places
4	Slovenia	3	0	0	3	76	89	−13	0	13–16th places

Source: IHF
Rules for classification: 1) points; 2) head-to-head points; 3) head-to-head goal difference; 4) head-to-head number of goals scored; 5) goal difference.
(H) Hosts

7 August 2023; 17:30	Hungary	29–31	Portugal	Varaždin Arena, Varaždin; Attendance: 150; Referees: Covalciuc, Covalciuc (MDA)
7 August 2023; 17:30	Kovács 14	(16–11)	Lourenço, Sousa 6	Varaždin Arena, Varaždin; Attendance: 150; Referees: Covalciuc, Covalciuc (MDA)
7 August 2023; 17:30	7× (suspension)	Report	1× (yellow card) 4× (suspension)	Varaždin Arena, Varaždin; Attendance: 150; Referees: Covalciuc, Covalciuc (MDA)

7 August 2023; 19:30	Croatia	32–25	Slovenia	Varaždin Arena, Varaždin; Attendance: 1,400; Referees: Carmaux, Mursch (FRA)
7 August 2023; 19:30	Ivanišević 7	(13–11)	Hriberšek 9	Varaždin Arena, Varaždin; Attendance: 1,400; Referees: Carmaux, Mursch (FRA)
7 August 2023; 19:30	1× (yellow card) 4× (suspension) 2× (red card)	Report	1× (yellow card) 3× (suspension)	Varaždin Arena, Varaždin; Attendance: 1,400; Referees: Carmaux, Mursch (FRA)

8 August 2023; 17:30	Portugal	28–26	Slovenia	Varaždin Arena, Varaždin; Attendance: 200; Referees: García, El-Saied
8 August 2023; 17:30	Ferreira 6	(10–9)	Hriberšek, Mlivič 7	Varaždin Arena, Varaždin; Attendance: 200; Referees: García, El-Saied
8 August 2023; 17:30	1× (yellow card) 5× (suspension)	Report	1× (yellow card) 5× (suspension) 1× (red card)	Varaždin Arena, Varaždin; Attendance: 200; Referees: García, El-Saied

8 August 2023; 19:30	Croatia	28–28	Hungary	Varaždin Arena, Varaždin; Attendance: 1,200; Referees: Perdomo, Araújo (URU)
8 August 2023; 19:30	Bajan 9	(15–13)	Kovács 6	Varaždin Arena, Varaždin; Attendance: 1,200; Referees: Perdomo, Araújo (URU)
8 August 2023; 19:30	4× (suspension)	Report	4× (suspension)	Varaždin Arena, Varaždin; Attendance: 1,200; Referees: Perdomo, Araújo (URU)

=== Group II ===
Pos	Team	Pld	W	D	L	GF	GA	GD	Pts	Qualification
1	Spain	3	3	0	0	109	85	+24	6	Quarterfinals
2	Egypt	3	2	0	1	101	87	+14	4	Quarterfinals
3	Czech Republic	3	1	0	2	76	77	−1	2	9–12th places
4	Brazil	3	0	0	3	72	109	−37	0	13–16th places

Source: IHF
Rules for classification: 1) points; 2) head-to-head points; 3) head-to-head goal difference; 4) head-to-head number of goals scored; 5) goal difference.

7 August 2023; 17:30	Egypt	38–23	Brazil	Josip Samardžija-Bepo, Koprivnica; Attendance: 50; Referees: Vujačić, Kažanegra (MNE)
7 August 2023; 17:30	El-Battawi 8	(19–10)	Santos 4	Josip Samardžija-Bepo, Koprivnica; Attendance: 50; Referees: Vujačić, Kažanegra (MNE)
7 August 2023; 17:30	1× (yellow card) 2× (suspension)	Report	1× (yellow card) 3× (suspension)	Josip Samardžija-Bepo, Koprivnica; Attendance: 50; Referees: Vujačić, Kažanegra (MNE)

7 August 2023; 19:30	Spain	29–21	Czech Republic	Josip Samardžija-Bepo, Koprivnica; Attendance: 100; Referees: Ismoilov, Ismoilov (UZB)
7 August 2023; 19:30	Romero, Jelcic 6	(14–10)	Matouš 6	Josip Samardžija-Bepo, Koprivnica; Attendance: 100; Referees: Ismoilov, Ismoilov (UZB)
7 August 2023; 19:30	1× (yellow card) 3× (suspension)	Report	1× (yellow card) 1× (suspension)	Josip Samardžija-Bepo, Koprivnica; Attendance: 100; Referees: Ismoilov, Ismoilov (UZB)

8 August 2023; 17:30	Czech Republic	33–20	Brazil	Josip Samardžija-Bepo, Koprivnica; Attendance: 50; Referees: Al-Enezi, Al-Nasem (KUW)
8 August 2023; 17:30	Jonáš, Matouš 6	(17–11)	Da Silva 5	Josip Samardžija-Bepo, Koprivnica; Attendance: 50; Referees: Al-Enezi, Al-Nasem (KUW)
8 August 2023; 17:30	4× (suspension)	Report	7× (suspension) 1× (red card)	Josip Samardžija-Bepo, Koprivnica; Attendance: 50; Referees: Al-Enezi, Al-Nasem (KUW)

8 August 2023; 19:30	Egypt	35–42	Spain	Josip Samardžija-Bepo, Koprivnica; Attendance: 150; Referees: Carmaux, Mursch (FRA)
8 August 2023; 19:30	El-Battawi 7	(17–20)	Delgado 10	Josip Samardžija-Bepo, Koprivnica; Attendance: 150; Referees: Carmaux, Mursch (FRA)
8 August 2023; 19:30	1× (yellow card) 9× (suspension) 1× (red card)	Report	1× (yellow card) 9× (suspension) 1× (red card)	Josip Samardžija-Bepo, Koprivnica; Attendance: 150; Referees: Carmaux, Mursch (FRA)

=== Group III ===
Pos	Team	Pld	W	D	L	GF	GA	GD	Pts	Qualification
1	Denmark	3	3	0	0	115	87	+28	6	Quarterfinals
2	Norway	3	2	0	1	85	82	+3	4	Quarterfinals
3	North Macedonia	3	1	0	2	84	86	−2	2	9–12th places
4	Austria	3	0	0	3	72	101	−29	0	13–16th places

Source: IHF
Rules for classification: 1) points; 2) head-to-head points; 3) head-to-head goal difference; 4) head-to-head number of goals scored; 5) goal difference.

7 August 2023; 17:30	Denmark	37–30	North Macedonia	Centar Zamet, Rijeka; Attendance: 110; Referees: Correa, Correa (BRA)
7 August 2023; 17:30	Tombak, Vilhelmsen 7	(18–12)	Dimevski, Mitev 6	Centar Zamet, Rijeka; Attendance: 110; Referees: Correa, Correa (BRA)
7 August 2023; 17:30	3× (suspension)	Report	1× (yellow card) 4× (suspension)	Centar Zamet, Rijeka; Attendance: 110; Referees: Correa, Correa (BRA)

7 August 2023; 19:30	Norway	29–22	Austria	Centar Zamet, Rijeka; Attendance: 90; Referees: Correa, Conberse (ARG)
7 August 2023; 19:30	Lid 10	(14–10)	Möstl 5	Centar Zamet, Rijeka; Attendance: 90; Referees: Correa, Conberse (ARG)
7 August 2023; 19:30	6× (suspension)	Report	3× (suspension)	Centar Zamet, Rijeka; Attendance: 90; Referees: Correa, Conberse (ARG)

8 August 2023; 17:30	Austria	22–29	North Macedonia	Centar Zamet, Rijeka; Attendance: 120; Referees: Furukawa, Murata (JPN)
8 August 2023; 17:30	Fritsch 4	(8–14)	Belistojanovski, Kalajdjieski 6	Centar Zamet, Rijeka; Attendance: 120; Referees: Furukawa, Murata (JPN)
8 August 2023; 17:30	1× (yellow card) 2× (suspension)	Report	1× (yellow card) 2× (suspension)	Centar Zamet, Rijeka; Attendance: 120; Referees: Furukawa, Murata (JPN)

8 August 2023; 19:30	Denmark	35–29	Norway	Centar Zamet, Rijeka; Attendance: 100; Referees: Thiyagarajah, Thiyagarajah (GER)
8 August 2023; 19:30	Vilhelmsen 7	(15–14)	Olseth 8	Centar Zamet, Rijeka; Attendance: 100; Referees: Thiyagarajah, Thiyagarajah (GER)
8 August 2023; 19:30	2× (suspension)	Report	4× (suspension)	Centar Zamet, Rijeka; Attendance: 100; Referees: Thiyagarajah, Thiyagarajah (GER)

=== Group IV ===
Pos	Team	Pld	W	D	L	GF	GA	GD	Pts	Qualification
1	Faroe Islands	3	2	0	1	98	80	+18	4 (Note: Germany 28–30 Faroe Islands)	Quarterfinals
2	Germany	3	2	0	1	97	81	+16	4	Quarterfinals
3	Saudi Arabia	3	1	0	2	78	104	−26	2 (Note: Iran 26–29 Saudi Arabia)	9–12th places
4	Iran	3	1	0	2	80	88	−8	2	13–16th places

Source: IHF
Rules for classification: 1) points; 2) head-to-head points; 3) head-to-head goal difference; 4) head-to-head number of goals scored; 5) goal difference.
Notes:

7 August 2023; 17:00	Germany	28–30	Faroe Islands	Sports Hall Marino Cvetković, Opatija; Attendance: 350; Referees: Lončar, Lončar (CRO)
7 August 2023; 17:00	Anselm 7	(10–12)	Mittún 13	Sports Hall Marino Cvetković, Opatija; Attendance: 350; Referees: Lončar, Lončar (CRO)
7 August 2023; 17:00	2× (yellow card) 7× (suspension)	Report	1× (yellow card) 5× (suspension)	Sports Hall Marino Cvetković, Opatija; Attendance: 350; Referees: Lončar, Lončar (CRO)

7 August 2023; 19:00	Iran	26–29	Saudi Arabia	Sports Hall Marino Cvetković, Opatija; Attendance: 130; Referees: Altmár, Horváth (HUN)
7 August 2023; 19:00	Dareini 7	(14–10)	Furaij 12	Sports Hall Marino Cvetković, Opatija; Attendance: 130; Referees: Altmár, Horváth (HUN)
7 August 2023; 19:00	1× (yellow card) 7× (suspension)	Report	1× (yellow card) 4× (suspension)	Sports Hall Marino Cvetković, Opatija; Attendance: 130; Referees: Altmár, Horváth (HUN)

8 August 2023; 17:00	Saudi Arabia	23–41	Faroe Islands	Sports Hall Marino Cvetković, Opatija; Attendance: 300; Referees: Nikolovski, Metalari (MKD)
8 August 2023; 17:00	Al-Marhoon 7	(11–22)	Vedelsbøl 9	Sports Hall Marino Cvetković, Opatija; Attendance: 300; Referees: Nikolovski, Metalari (MKD)
8 August 2023; 17:00	3× (suspension)	Report	3× (suspension)	Sports Hall Marino Cvetković, Opatija; Attendance: 300; Referees: Nikolovski, Metalari (MKD)

8 August 2023; 19:00	Germany	32–25	Iran	Sports Hall Marino Cvetković, Opatija; Attendance: 200; Referees: Correa, Conberse (ARG)
8 August 2023; 19:00	Günther 8	(13–9)	Karami 5	Sports Hall Marino Cvetković, Opatija; Attendance: 200; Referees: Correa, Conberse (ARG)
8 August 2023; 19:00	3× (suspension)	Report	5× (suspension)	Sports Hall Marino Cvetković, Opatija; Attendance: 200; Referees: Correa, Conberse (ARG)

== Classification games ==
=== 29th–32nd places ===
Burundi withdrew their team before the placement round as some players were unable to be found.

==== Bracket ====
29th–32nd place semifinals
10 August
New Zealand	23
Mexico	52
10 August
Bahrain	10
Burundi	0

29th place game
11 August
Mexico	21
Bahrain	37
31st place game
11 August
New Zealand	10
Burundi	0

==== Semifinals ====
10 August 2023; 12:30	New Zealand	23–52	Mexico	Sports Hall Marino Cvetković, Opatija; Attendance: 50; Referees: Hussein, Imran (IRQ)
10 August 2023; 12:30	Pringot 9	(10–25)	García 16	Sports Hall Marino Cvetković, Opatija; Attendance: 50; Referees: Hussein, Imran (IRQ)
10 August 2023; 12:30	2× (suspension)	Report	3× (suspension)	Sports Hall Marino Cvetković, Opatija; Attendance: 50; Referees: Hussein, Imran (IRQ)

Cancelled	Bahrain	10–0 (Note: Burundi withdrew their team and the results were counted as a 10–0 win for the opposing team.)	Burundi

==== 31st place game ====
Cancelled	New Zealand	10–0	Burundi

==== 29th place game ====
11 August 2023; 12:30	Mexico	21–37	Bahrain	Sports Hall Marino Cvetković, Opatija; Attendance: 50; Referees: Lee, Lee (KOR)
11 August 2023; 12:30	García, Navarro 5	(14–18)	Al-Showaikh 9	Sports Hall Marino Cvetković, Opatija; Attendance: 50; Referees: Lee, Lee (KOR)
11 August 2023; 12:30	4× (suspension)	Report	1× (suspension)	Sports Hall Marino Cvetković, Opatija; Attendance: 50; Referees: Lee, Lee (KOR)

=== 25–28th places ===
==== Bracket ====
25–28th place semifinals
10 August
Rwanda	33
Georgia	41
10 August
South Korea	36
United States	19

25th place game
11 August
Georgia	30
South Korea	33
27th place game
11 August
Rwanda	41
United States	29

==== Semifinals ====
10 August 2023; 17:30	Rwanda	33–41	Georgia	Sports Hall Marino Cvetković, Opatija; Attendance: 100; Referees: Reyes, Zuñiga (CUB)
10 August 2023; 17:30	Yves 14	(13–16)	Darsania, Khelisupali 12	Sports Hall Marino Cvetković, Opatija; Attendance: 100; Referees: Reyes, Zuñiga (CUB)
10 August 2023; 17:30	1× (yellow card) 5× (suspension) 1× (red card)	Report	2× (suspension)	Sports Hall Marino Cvetković, Opatija; Attendance: 100; Referees: Reyes, Zuñiga (CUB)

10 August 2023; 20:00	South Korea	36–19	United States	Sports Hall Marino Cvetković, Opatija; Attendance: 100; Referees: Correa, Correa (BRA)
10 August 2023; 20:00	Son 8	(23–8)	Edwards 6	Sports Hall Marino Cvetković, Opatija; Attendance: 100; Referees: Correa, Correa (BRA)
10 August 2023; 20:00	1× (yellow card) 4× (suspension)	Report	1× (yellow card) 4× (suspension)	Sports Hall Marino Cvetković, Opatija; Attendance: 100; Referees: Correa, Correa (BRA)

==== 27th place game ====
11 August 2023; 15:00	Rwanda	41–29	United States	Sports Hall Marino Cvetković, Opatija; Attendance: 100; Referees: Chouraki, El Mouniri (MAR)
11 August 2023; 15:00	Yves 10	(19–11)	Edwards 10	Sports Hall Marino Cvetković, Opatija; Attendance: 100; Referees: Chouraki, El Mouniri (MAR)
11 August 2023; 15:00	5× (suspension)	Report	3× (suspension)	Sports Hall Marino Cvetković, Opatija; Attendance: 100; Referees: Chouraki, El Mouniri (MAR)

==== 25th place game ====
11 August 2023; 17:30	Georgia	30–33	South Korea	Sports Hall Marino Cvetković, Opatija; Attendance: 30; Referees: Hussein, Imran (IRQ)
11 August 2023; 17:30	Darsania 8	(18–14)	Lee 8	Sports Hall Marino Cvetković, Opatija; Attendance: 30; Referees: Hussein, Imran (IRQ)
11 August 2023; 17:30	6× (suspension)	Report	5× (suspension)	Sports Hall Marino Cvetković, Opatija; Attendance: 30; Referees: Hussein, Imran (IRQ)

=== 21st–24th places ===
==== Bracket ====
21st–24th place semifinals
10 August
Algeria	28
Chile	24
10 August
Japan	29
Argentina	28

21st place game
11 August
Algeria	24
Japan	29
23rd place game
11 August
Chile	22
Argentina	27

==== Semifinals ====
10 August 2023; 12:30	Algeria	28–24	Chile	Centar Zamet, Rijeka; Attendance: 20; Referees: Prastalo, Balvan (BIH)
10 August 2023; 12:30	Bendiab, Mehdi 6	(11–14)	Sovino 7	Centar Zamet, Rijeka; Attendance: 20; Referees: Prastalo, Balvan (BIH)
10 August 2023; 12:30	5× (suspension)	Report	1× (yellow card) 3× (suspension)	Centar Zamet, Rijeka; Attendance: 20; Referees: Prastalo, Balvan (BIH)

10 August 2023; 15:00	Japan	29–28	Argentina	Centar Zamet, Rijeka; Attendance: 35; Referees: Chouraki, El Mouniri (MAR)
10 August 2023; 15:00	Furukawa 8	(18–16)	Gómez 6	Centar Zamet, Rijeka; Attendance: 35; Referees: Chouraki, El Mouniri (MAR)
10 August 2023; 15:00		Report	3× (suspension)	Centar Zamet, Rijeka; Attendance: 35; Referees: Chouraki, El Mouniri (MAR)

==== 23rd place game ====
11 August 2023; 12:30	Chile	22–27	Argentina	Centar Zamet, Rijeka; Attendance: 45; Referees: Zhou, Cheng (CHN)
11 August 2023; 12:30	Oyarzún 6	(8–14)	Obregón 5	Centar Zamet, Rijeka; Attendance: 45; Referees: Zhou, Cheng (CHN)
11 August 2023; 12:30	2× (suspension)	Report	2× (suspension)	Centar Zamet, Rijeka; Attendance: 45; Referees: Zhou, Cheng (CHN)

==== 21st place game ====
11 August 2023; 15:00	Algeria	24–29	Japan	Centar Zamet, Rijeka; Attendance: 40; Referees: Correa, Correa (BRA)
11 August 2023; 15:00	Anisse 7	(10–17)	Hasegawa 9	Centar Zamet, Rijeka; Attendance: 40; Referees: Correa, Correa (BRA)
11 August 2023; 15:00	4× (suspension)	Report	3× (suspension)	Centar Zamet, Rijeka; Attendance: 40; Referees: Correa, Correa (BRA)

=== 17–20th places ===
==== Bracket ====
17–20th place semifinals
10 August
Morocco (Pen.)	26 (4)
Montenegro	26 (2)
10 August
Iceland	36
Sweden	41

17th place game
11 August
Morocco	20
Sweden	47
19th place game
11 August
Montenegro	32
Iceland	38

==== Semifinals ====
10 August 2023
17:30
Morocco
30–28
Montenegro
Centar Zamet, Rijeka
Attendance: 50
Referees: Furukawa, Murata (JPN)
Mansouri, Razgui 7
(17–12)
Radovanović 9
4× (suspension) 1× (red card)
Report
1× (yellow card) 3× (suspension) 2× (red card)

FT: 26–26 Pen: 4–2

10 August 2023; 20:00	Iceland	36–41	Sweden	Centar Zamet, Rijeka; Attendance: 60; Referees: Nikolovski, Metalari (MKD)
10 August 2023; 20:00	Stefánsson 9	(21–20)	Månsson 10	Centar Zamet, Rijeka; Attendance: 60; Referees: Nikolovski, Metalari (MKD)
10 August 2023; 20:00	1× (yellow card) 3× (suspension)	Report	1× (yellow card) 2× (suspension)	Centar Zamet, Rijeka; Attendance: 60; Referees: Nikolovski, Metalari (MKD)

==== 19th place game ====
11 August 2023; 17:30	Montenegro	32–38	Iceland	Centar Zamet, Rijeka; Attendance: 55; Referees: Emam, Hedaia (EGY)
11 August 2023; 17:30	Gadzic 12	(15–18)	Erlingsson 9	Centar Zamet, Rijeka; Attendance: 55; Referees: Emam, Hedaia (EGY)
11 August 2023; 17:30	6× (suspension)	Report	4× (suspension)	Centar Zamet, Rijeka; Attendance: 55; Referees: Emam, Hedaia (EGY)

==== 17th place game ====
11 August 2023; 20:00	Morocco	20–47	Sweden	Centar Zamet, Rijeka; Attendance: 40; Referees: Reyes, Zuñiga (CUB)
11 August 2023; 20:00	Razgui 8	(12–26)	Lundstad 10	Centar Zamet, Rijeka; Attendance: 40; Referees: Reyes, Zuñiga (CUB)
11 August 2023; 20:00	2× (suspension)	Report	3× (suspension)	Centar Zamet, Rijeka; Attendance: 40; Referees: Reyes, Zuñiga (CUB)

=== 13–16th places ===
==== Bracket ====
13–16th place semifinals
10 August
Slovenia	25
Austria	28
10 August
Brazil	30
Iran	24

13th place game
11 August
Austria	36
Brazil	24
15th place game
11 August
Slovenia	30
Iran	22

==== Semifinals ====
10 August 2023; 12:30	Brazil	30–24	Iran	Josip Samardžija-Bepo, Koprivnica; Attendance: 50; Referees: Lončar, Lončar (CRO)
10 August 2023; 12:30	Candido, Da Silva 7	(15–11)	Karami 9	Josip Samardžija-Bepo, Koprivnica; Attendance: 50; Referees: Lončar, Lončar (CRO)
10 August 2023; 12:30	3× (suspension)	Report	3× (suspension)	Josip Samardžija-Bepo, Koprivnica; Attendance: 50; Referees: Lončar, Lončar (CRO)

10 August 2023; 15:00	Slovenia	25–28	Austria	Josip Samardžija-Bepo, Koprivnica; Attendance: 50; Referees: Al-Enzei, Al-Nazem (KUW)
10 August 2023; 15:00	Hriberšek 6	(11–15)	Paulnsteiner 4	Josip Samardžija-Bepo, Koprivnica; Attendance: 50; Referees: Al-Enzei, Al-Nazem (KUW)
10 August 2023; 15:00	1× (yellow card) 2× (suspension)	Report	1× (yellow card) 5× (suspension) 1× (red card)	Josip Samardžija-Bepo, Koprivnica; Attendance: 50; Referees: Al-Enzei, Al-Nazem (KUW)

==== 15th place game ====
11 August 2023; 12:30	Slovenia	30–22	Iran	Josip Samardžija-Bepo, Koprivnica; Attendance: 50; Referees: Ismoilov, Ismoilov (UZB)
11 August 2023; 12:30	Malik 5	(14–9)	Dareini 4	Josip Samardžija-Bepo, Koprivnica; Attendance: 50; Referees: Ismoilov, Ismoilov (UZB)
11 August 2023; 12:30	4× (suspension)	Report	3× (suspension) 1× (red card)	Josip Samardžija-Bepo, Koprivnica; Attendance: 50; Referees: Ismoilov, Ismoilov (UZB)

==== 13th place game ====
11 August 2023; 15:00	Austria	36–24	Brazil	Josip Samardžija-Bepo, Koprivnica; Attendance: 50; Referees: Vujačić, Kažanegra (MNE)
11 August 2023; 15:00	Wuzella 8	(20–14)	Da Silva 6	Josip Samardžija-Bepo, Koprivnica; Attendance: 50; Referees: Vujačić, Kažanegra (MNE)
11 August 2023; 15:00	7× (suspension)	Report	4× (suspension)	Josip Samardžija-Bepo, Koprivnica; Attendance: 50; Referees: Vujačić, Kažanegra (MNE)

=== 9–12th places ===
==== Bracket ====
9–12th place semifinals
10 August
Hungary	20
North Macedonia	22
10 August
Czech Republic	36
Saudi Arabia	33

Ninth place game
11 August
North Macedonia	28
Czech Republic	22
11th place game
11 August
Hungary	40
Saudi Arabia	24

==== Semifinals ====
10 August 2023; 17:30	Czech Republic	36–33	Saudi Arabia	Josip Samardžija-Bepo, Koprivnica; Attendance: 100; Referees: Perdomo, Araújo (URU)
10 August 2023; 17:30	Matouš 11	(19–15)	Furaij 9	Josip Samardžija-Bepo, Koprivnica; Attendance: 100; Referees: Perdomo, Araújo (URU)
10 August 2023; 17:30	5× (suspension)	Report	1× (yellow card) 7× (suspension) 2× (red card)	Josip Samardžija-Bepo, Koprivnica; Attendance: 100; Referees: Perdomo, Araújo (URU)

10 August 2023; 20:00	Hungary	20–22	North Macedonia	Josip Samardžija-Bepo, Koprivnica; Attendance: 100; Referees: Ismoilov, Ismoilov (UZB)
10 August 2023; 20:00	Czabula 5	(12–12)	Kalajdjieski, Petkovski 5	Josip Samardžija-Bepo, Koprivnica; Attendance: 100; Referees: Ismoilov, Ismoilov (UZB)
10 August 2023; 20:00	3× (suspension)	Report	1× (yellow card) 5× (suspension)	Josip Samardžija-Bepo, Koprivnica; Attendance: 100; Referees: Ismoilov, Ismoilov (UZB)

==== 11th place game ====
11 August 2023; 17:30	Hungary	40–24	Saudi Arabia	Josip Samardžija-Bepo, Koprivnica; Attendance: 50; Referees: Lončar, Lončar (CRO)
11 August 2023; 17:30	Szucs 6	(20–10)	Furaij 5	Josip Samardžija-Bepo, Koprivnica; Attendance: 50; Referees: Lončar, Lončar (CRO)
11 August 2023; 17:30	7× (suspension)	Report	1× (yellow card) 4× (suspension)	Josip Samardžija-Bepo, Koprivnica; Attendance: 50; Referees: Lončar, Lončar (CRO)

==== Ninth place game ====
11 August 2023; 20:00	North Macedonia	28–22	Czech Republic	Josip Samardžija-Bepo, Koprivnica; Attendance: 50; Referees: Covalciuc, Covalciuc (MDA)
11 August 2023; 20:00	Kalajdjieski 12	(13–11)	Josef 8	Josip Samardžija-Bepo, Koprivnica; Attendance: 50; Referees: Covalciuc, Covalciuc (MDA)
11 August 2023; 20:00	6× (suspension)	Report	1× (yellow card) 5× (suspension)	Josip Samardžija-Bepo, Koprivnica; Attendance: 50; Referees: Covalciuc, Covalciuc (MDA)

== Knockout stage ==
=== Bracket ===
Championship bracket

Quarter-finals
10 August
Croatia	33
Norway	25
10 August
Spain	32
Germany	28
10 August
Denmark	35
Portugal	25
10 August
Faroe Islands	34
Egypt (OT)	38

Semi-finals
11 August
Croatia	29
Spain	37
11 August
Denmark	39
Egypt	35

Final
13 August
Spain	28
Denmark	23
Third place
13 August
Croatia (OT)	39
Egypt	37

5–8th place bracket

5–8th place semifinals
11 August
Norway	30
Germany	35
11 August
Portugal (Pen.)	35 (6)
Faroe Islands	35 (5)

Fifth place game
13 August
Germany	31
Portugal	27
Seventh place game
13 August
Norway	38
Faroe Islands	35

=== Quarterfinals ===
10 August 2023
13:00
Faroe Islands
34–38 (ET)
Egypt
Varaždin Arena, Varaždin
Attendance: 130
Referees: Altmar, Horvath (HUN)
Mittún 10
(13–13)
Hashad 11
1× (yellow card) 4× (suspension)
Report
1× (yellow card) 7× (suspension)

FT: 31–31 ET: 3–7

10 August 2023; 15:30	Spain	32–28	Germany	Varaždin Arena, Varaždin; Attendance: 200; Referees: Covalciuc, Covalciuc (MDA)
10 August 2023; 15:30	Castillo, Cikusa 7	(16–12)	Siemer 7	Varaždin Arena, Varaždin; Attendance: 200; Referees: Covalciuc, Covalciuc (MDA)
10 August 2023; 15:30	1× (yellow card) 4× (suspension)	Report	1× (yellow card) 5× (suspension)	Varaždin Arena, Varaždin; Attendance: 200; Referees: Covalciuc, Covalciuc (MDA)

10 August 2023; 18:00	Denmark	35–25	Portugal	Varaždin Arena, Varaždin; Attendance: 320; Referees: Vujačić, Kažanegra (MNE)
10 August 2023; 18:00	Pedersen 9	(20–14)	Monteiro 9	Varaždin Arena, Varaždin; Attendance: 320; Referees: Vujačić, Kažanegra (MNE)
10 August 2023; 18:00	3× (suspension)	Report	1× (yellow card) 4× (suspension)	Varaždin Arena, Varaždin; Attendance: 320; Referees: Vujačić, Kažanegra (MNE)

10 August 2023; 20:30	Croatia	33–25	Norway	Varaždin Arena, Varaždin; Attendance: 1,500; Referees: García, El-Saied
10 August 2023; 20:30	Jurić 8	(14–9)	Lid 9	Varaždin Arena, Varaždin; Attendance: 1,500; Referees: García, El-Saied
10 August 2023; 20:30	1× (yellow card) 6× (suspension)	Report	2× (suspension)	Varaždin Arena, Varaždin; Attendance: 1,500; Referees: García, El-Saied

=== 5–8th place semifinals ===
11 August 2023
13:00
Portugal
41–40
Faroe Islands
Varaždin Arena, Varaždin
Attendance: 120
Referees: Correa, Conberse (ARG)
Lourenço, Sousa 9
(17–19)
Mittún, Vedelsbøl 12
3× (suspension)
Report
1× (suspension)

FT: 35–35 Pen: 6–5

11 August 2023; 15:30	Norway	30–35	Germany	Varaždin Arena, Varaždin; Attendance: 275; Referees: Carmaux, Mursch (FRA)
11 August 2023; 15:30	Lid 9	(15–16)	Siemer 8	Varaždin Arena, Varaždin; Attendance: 275; Referees: Carmaux, Mursch (FRA)
11 August 2023; 15:30	6× (suspension) 1× (red card)	Report	1× (yellow card) 7× (suspension)	Varaždin Arena, Varaždin; Attendance: 275; Referees: Carmaux, Mursch (FRA)

=== Semifinals ===
11 August 2023; 18:00	Denmark	39–35	Egypt	Varaždin Arena, Varaždin; Attendance: 400; Referees: Perdomo, Araújo (URU)
11 August 2023; 18:00	Pedersen 9	(23–18)	Hashad 7	Varaždin Arena, Varaždin; Attendance: 400; Referees: Perdomo, Araújo (URU)
11 August 2023; 18:00	2× (suspension)	Report	1× (yellow card) 3× (suspension)	Varaždin Arena, Varaždin; Attendance: 400; Referees: Perdomo, Araújo (URU)

11 August 2023; 20:30	Croatia	29–37	Spain	Varaždin Arena, Varaždin; Attendance: 1,400; Referees: Thiyagarajah, Thiyagarajah (GER)
11 August 2023; 20:30	Krupić 9	(11–15)	González 11	Varaždin Arena, Varaždin; Attendance: 1,400; Referees: Thiyagarajah, Thiyagarajah (GER)
11 August 2023; 20:30	1× (yellow card) 5× (suspension)	Report	4× (suspension)	Varaždin Arena, Varaždin; Attendance: 1,400; Referees: Thiyagarajah, Thiyagarajah (GER)

=== Seventh place game ===
13 August 2023; 12:30	Norway	38–35	Faroe Islands	Varaždin Arena, Varaždin; Attendance: 150; Referees: Vujačić, Kažanegra (MNE)
13 August 2023; 12:30	Olseth 11	(22–19)	Mittún 11	Varaždin Arena, Varaždin; Attendance: 150; Referees: Vujačić, Kažanegra (MNE)
13 August 2023; 12:30	2× (suspension)	Report	1× (suspension)	Varaždin Arena, Varaždin; Attendance: 150; Referees: Vujačić, Kažanegra (MNE)

=== Fifth place game ===
13 August 2023; 15:00	Germany	31–27	Portugal	Varaždin Arena, Varaždin; Attendance: 300; Referees: Altmár, Horváth (HUN)
13 August 2023; 15:00	Battermann 10	(17–12)	Leite 8	Varaždin Arena, Varaždin; Attendance: 300; Referees: Altmár, Horváth (HUN)
13 August 2023; 15:00	3× (suspension)	Report	1× (suspension) 1× (red card)	Varaždin Arena, Varaždin; Attendance: 300; Referees: Altmár, Horváth (HUN)

=== Third place game ===
13 August 2023
17:30
Egypt
37–39 (ET)
Croatia
Varaždin Arena, Varaždin
Attendance: 1,750
Referees: Correa, Conberse (ARG)
Khallaf 8
(17–18)
Krupić 7
1× (yellow card) 5× (suspension)
Report
5× (suspension)

FT: 30–30 ET: 7–9

=== Final ===
13 August 2023; 20:00	Denmark	23–28	Spain	Varaždin Arena, Varaždin; Attendance: 950; Referees: Carmaux, Mursch (FRA)
13 August 2023; 20:00	Pedersen 6	(14–13)	Oliveras 7	Varaždin Arena, Varaždin; Attendance: 950; Referees: Carmaux, Mursch (FRA)
13 August 2023; 20:00	2× (suspension)	Report	1× (yellow card) 2× (suspension)	Varaždin Arena, Varaždin; Attendance: 950; Referees: Carmaux, Mursch (FRA)

== Final ranking ==
Rank	Team
1st place, gold medalist(s)	Spain
2nd place, silver medalist(s)	Denmark
3rd place, bronze medalist(s)	Croatia
4	Egypt
5	Germany
6	Portugal
7	Norway
8	Faroe Islands
9	North Macedonia
10	Czech Republic
11	Hungary
12	Saudi Arabia
13	Austria
14	Brazil
15	Slovenia
16	Iran
17	Sweden
18	Morocco
19	Iceland
20	Montenegro
21	Japan
22	Algeria
23	Argentina
24	Chile
25	South Korea
26	Georgia
27	Rwanda
28	United States
29	Bahrain
30	Mexico
31	New Zealand
32	Burundi

== Statistics and awards ==
=== Top goalscorers ===
Rank	Name	Goals	Shots	%
1	(Faroe Islands) Óli Mittún	87	129	67
2	(Denmark) Frederik Emil Pedersen	56	70	80
2	(Germany) Marvin Siemer	56	75	75
4	(Rwanda) Mbesutunguwe Samuel	55	119	46
4	(Rwanda) Kayijama Yves	55	80	69
6	(Georgia (country)) Sandro Darsania	53	88	60
7	(Faroe Islands) Ísak Vedelsbøl	52	64	81
7	(Saudi Arabia) Hussain Furaij	52	69	75
9	(Norway) Marius Olseth	51	63	81
10	(Norway) Lasse Sunde Lid	50	80	63

Source: IHF

=== Top goalkeepers ===
Rank	Name	%	Saves	Shots
1	(Sweden) Arvid Norén	44	38	87
2	(Austria) Leon Bergmann	42	98	232
2	(Iran) Seyedmehrshad Daneshi	42	16	38
4	(Denmark) Malte Eichhorst	40	56	140
5	(Sweden) Emil Holmberg	39	37	96
6	(Croatia) Marko Prpić	38	53	140
6	(Germany) Marc Buchele	38	50	132
8	(Sweden) Arvid Skoog	37	39	106
9	(Hungary) Attila Radvánszki	36	32	90
10	(Czech Republic) Vojtěch Košťálek	35	44	125
10	(Spain) Álvaro Pérez Méndez	35	76	215

Source: IHF

=== Awards ===
The All-star team was announced on 13 August 2023.

Position	Player
MVP	(Denmark) Frederik Emil Pedersen
Goalkeeper	(Spain) Álvaro Pérez Méndez
Right wing	(Spain) Xavier González Unciti
Right back	(Denmark) Lasse Vilhelmsen
Centre back	(Faroe Islands) Óli Mittún
Left back	(Croatia) Aleksandar Čaprić
Left wing	(Egypt) Belal Ibrahim Massoud
Pivot	(Spain) Víctor Romero Holguín
