= 2022 South and Central American Men's Youth Handball Championship =

Tournament details
- Host country: Argentina
- Venue(s): 1 (in 1 host city)
- Dates: 8–12 November
- Teams: 8 (from 1 confederation)

Final positions
- Champions: Argentina (1st title)
- Runners-up: Brazil
- Third place: Chile
- Fourth place: Uruguay

Tournament statistics
- Matches played: 20
- Goals scored: 1,136 (56.8 per match)

The 2022 South and Central American Men's Youth Handball Championship took place in Buenos Aires, Argentina at the La Casa del Handball Argentino, from 8 to 12 November 2022. It acted as the South and Central American qualifying tournament for the 2023 Men's Youth World Handball Championship.The tournament also serves as a qualification event for the Intercontinental Phase of the IHF Trophy.

== Preliminary round ==
All times are local (UTC–3).

=== Group A ===
Pos	Team	Pld	W	D	L	GF	GA	GD	Pts	Qualification
1	Brazil	3	3	0	0	119	45	+74	6	Semifinals
2	Uruguay	3	2	0	1	82	83	−1	4	Semifinals
3	Nicaragua	3	1	0	2	81	111	−30	2	5–8th place semifinals
4	Guatemala	3	0	0	3	49	92	−43	0	5–8th place semifinals

Source: torneoscoscabal.com
Rules for classification: 1) Points; 2) Head-to-head points; 3) Head-to-head goal difference; 4) Head-to-head goals scored; 5) Goal difference; 6) Goals scored; 7) Draw.

8 November 2022; 08:45	Uruguay	36–32	Nicaragua	La Casa del Handball Argentino, Buenos Aires; Attendance: 120
8 November 2022; 08:45		(17–15)		La Casa del Handball Argentino, Buenos Aires; Attendance: 120
8 November 2022; 08:45		Report		La Casa del Handball Argentino, Buenos Aires; Attendance: 120

8 November 2022; 15:45	Brazil	33–9	Guatemala	La Casa del Handball Argentino, Buenos Aires; Attendance: 50
8 November 2022; 15:45		(12–3)		La Casa del Handball Argentino, Buenos Aires; Attendance: 50
8 November 2022; 15:45		Report		La Casa del Handball Argentino, Buenos Aires; Attendance: 50

9 November 2022; 08:45	Nicaragua	18–50	Brazil	La Casa del Handball Argentino, Buenos Aires
9 November 2022; 08:45		(6–30)		La Casa del Handball Argentino, Buenos Aires

9 November 2022; 15:45	Guatemala	15–28	Uruguay	La Casa del Handball Argentino, Buenos Aires; Attendance: 155
9 November 2022; 15:45		(11–10)		La Casa del Handball Argentino, Buenos Aires; Attendance: 155
9 November 2022; 15:45		Report		La Casa del Handball Argentino, Buenos Aires; Attendance: 155

10 November 2022; 08:45	Nicaragua	31–25	Guatemala	La Casa del Handball Argentino, Buenos Aires; Attendance: 50
10 November 2022; 08:45		(16–12)		La Casa del Handball Argentino, Buenos Aires; Attendance: 50
10 November 2022; 08:45		Report		La Casa del Handball Argentino, Buenos Aires; Attendance: 50

10 November 2022; 15:45	Brazil	36–18	Uruguay	La Casa del Handball Argentino, Buenos Aires; Attendance: 380
10 November 2022; 15:45		(18–7)		La Casa del Handball Argentino, Buenos Aires; Attendance: 380
10 November 2022; 15:45		Report		La Casa del Handball Argentino, Buenos Aires; Attendance: 380

=== Group B ===
Pos	Team	Pld	W	D	L	GF	GA	GD	Pts	Qualification
1	Argentina (H)	3	3	0	0	116	53	+63	6	Semifinals
2	Chile	3	2	0	1	102	69	+33	4	Semifinals
3	Venezuela	3	1	0	2	62	113	−51	2	5–8th place semifinals
4	Paraguay	3	0	0	3	69	114	−45	0	5–8th place semifinals

Source: torneoscoscabal.com
Rules for classification: 1) Points; 2) Head-to-head points; 3) Head-to-head goal difference; 4) Head-to-head goals scored; 5) Goal difference; 6) Goals scored; 7) Draw.
(H) Hosts

8 November 2022; 12:15	Chile	43–25	Paraguay	La Casa del Handball Argentino, Buenos Aires; Attendance: 100
8 November 2022; 12:15		(20–15)		La Casa del Handball Argentino, Buenos Aires; Attendance: 100
8 November 2022; 12:15		Report		La Casa del Handball Argentino, Buenos Aires; Attendance: 100

8 November 2022; 19:15	Argentina	46–17	Venezuela	La Casa del Handball Argentino, Buenos Aires; Attendance: 800; Referees: Corrêa, Corrêa (BRA)
8 November 2022; 19:15	Rodríguez, Rozitchner 7	(18–6)	Toledo 5	La Casa del Handball Argentino, Buenos Aires; Attendance: 800; Referees: Corrêa, Corrêa (BRA)
8 November 2022; 19:15		Report	5× (suspension)	La Casa del Handball Argentino, Buenos Aires; Attendance: 800; Referees: Corrêa, Corrêa (BRA)

9 November 2022; 12:15	Venezuela	13–38	Chile	La Casa del Handball Argentino, Buenos Aires; Attendance: 80
9 November 2022; 12:15		(5–17)		La Casa del Handball Argentino, Buenos Aires; Attendance: 80
9 November 2022; 12:15		Report		La Casa del Handball Argentino, Buenos Aires; Attendance: 80

9 November 2022; 19:15	Paraguay	15–39	Argentina	La Casa del Handball Argentino, Buenos Aires; Attendance: 200; Referees: Aguilera, Gutiérrez (CHI)
9 November 2022; 19:15	Acosta 5	(3–21)	Obregón, Rodríguez 5	La Casa del Handball Argentino, Buenos Aires; Attendance: 200; Referees: Aguilera, Gutiérrez (CHI)
9 November 2022; 19:15	1× (yellow card) 5× (suspension) 2× (red card)	Report	1× (yellow card) 2× (suspension)	La Casa del Handball Argentino, Buenos Aires; Attendance: 200; Referees: Aguilera, Gutiérrez (CHI)

10 November 2022; 12:15	Venezuela	32–29	Paraguay	La Casa del Handball Argentino, Buenos Aires; Attendance: 70
10 November 2022; 12:15		(17–11)		La Casa del Handball Argentino, Buenos Aires; Attendance: 70
10 November 2022; 12:15		Report		La Casa del Handball Argentino, Buenos Aires; Attendance: 70

10 November 2022; 19:15	Argentina	31–21	Chile	La Casa del Handball Argentino, Buenos Aires; Attendance: 600; Referees: Araújo, Perdomo (URU)
10 November 2022; 19:15	three players 4	(17–9)	Sovino 4	La Casa del Handball Argentino, Buenos Aires; Attendance: 600; Referees: Araújo, Perdomo (URU)
10 November 2022; 19:15	2× (suspension)	Report	1× (yellow card) 3× (suspension)	La Casa del Handball Argentino, Buenos Aires; Attendance: 600; Referees: Araújo, Perdomo (URU)

== Knockout stage ==
=== Bracket ===
Semi-finals
11 November
Brazil	39
Chile	18
11 November
Argentina	34
Uruguay	20

Final
12 November
Brazil	19
Argentina	26
Third place
12 November
Chile	23
Uruguay	19

5–8th place bracket

5–8th place semifinals
11 November
Nicaragua	43
Paraguay	32
11 November
Venezuela	26
Guatemala	22

Fifth place
12 November
Nicaragua	41
Venezuela	37
Seventh place
12 November
Paraguay	28
Guatemala	29

=== 5–8th place semifinals ===
11 November 2022; 08:45	Nicaragua	43–32	Paraguay	La Casa del Handball Argentino, Buenos Aires; Attendance: 400
11 November 2022; 08:45		(18–20)		La Casa del Handball Argentino, Buenos Aires; Attendance: 400
11 November 2022; 08:45		Report		La Casa del Handball Argentino, Buenos Aires; Attendance: 400

11 November 2022; 12:15	Venezuela	26–22	Guatemala	La Casa del Handball Argentino, Buenos Aires; Attendance: 200
11 November 2022; 12:15		(11–11)		La Casa del Handball Argentino, Buenos Aires; Attendance: 200
11 November 2022; 12:15		Report		La Casa del Handball Argentino, Buenos Aires; Attendance: 200

=== Semifinals ===
11 November 2022; 15:45	Brazil	39–18	Chile	La Casa del Handball Argentino, Buenos Aires; Attendance: 100
11 November 2022; 15:45		(16–10)		La Casa del Handball Argentino, Buenos Aires; Attendance: 100
11 November 2022; 15:45		Report		La Casa del Handball Argentino, Buenos Aires; Attendance: 100

11 November 2022; 19:15	Argentina	34–20	Uruguay	La Casa del Handball Argentino, Buenos Aires; Attendance: 1,500; Referees: Marques, Geraldello (BRA)
11 November 2022; 19:15	Gull 6	(13–10)	Machiñena 8	La Casa del Handball Argentino, Buenos Aires; Attendance: 1,500; Referees: Marques, Geraldello (BRA)
11 November 2022; 19:15	1× (suspension) 1× (red card)	Report	3× (suspension)	La Casa del Handball Argentino, Buenos Aires; Attendance: 1,500; Referees: Marques, Geraldello (BRA)

=== Seventh place game ===
12 November 2022; 08:45	Paraguay	28–29	Guatemala	La Casa del Handball Argentino, Buenos Aires; Attendance: 30
12 November 2022; 08:45		(12–15)		La Casa del Handball Argentino, Buenos Aires; Attendance: 30
12 November 2022; 08:45		Report		La Casa del Handball Argentino, Buenos Aires; Attendance: 30

=== Fifth place game ===
12 November 2022; 12:15	Nicaragua	41–37	Venezuela	La Casa del Handball Argentino, Buenos Aires; Attendance: 100
12 November 2022; 12:15		(20–11)		La Casa del Handball Argentino, Buenos Aires; Attendance: 100
12 November 2022; 12:15		Report		La Casa del Handball Argentino, Buenos Aires; Attendance: 100

=== Third place game ===
12 November 2022; 15:45	Chile	23–19	Uruguay	La Casa del Handball Argentino, Buenos Aires; Attendance: 100
12 November 2022; 15:45		(15–9)		La Casa del Handball Argentino, Buenos Aires; Attendance: 100
12 November 2022; 15:45		Report		La Casa del Handball Argentino, Buenos Aires; Attendance: 100

=== Final ===
12 November 2022; 19:15	Brazil	19–26	Argentina	La Casa del Handball Argentino, Buenos Aires; Attendance: 1,500; Referees: Araújo, Perdomo (URU)
12 November 2022; 19:15	Bertoldo 5	(9–13)	Barceló 7	La Casa del Handball Argentino, Buenos Aires; Attendance: 1,500; Referees: Araújo, Perdomo (URU)
12 November 2022; 19:15	4× (suspension) 2× (red card)	Report	4× (suspension)	La Casa del Handball Argentino, Buenos Aires; Attendance: 1,500; Referees: Araújo, Perdomo (URU)

== Final standing ==
Rank	Team
1st place, gold medalist(s)	Argentina
2nd place, silver medalist(s)	Brazil
3rd place, bronze medalist(s)	Chile
4	Uruguay
5	Nicaragua
6	Venezuela
7	Guatemala
8	Paraguay

Qualified for the 2023 Men's Youth World Championship
Qualified for the 2023 IHF Inter-Continental Trophy

2022 South and Central American Men's Youth Champions

Argentina men's national youth handball team
First title

Team roster: Santino Diotallevi, Nicolas Gillermo Stocco, Bautista Gallardo, Ezequiel Rozitchner, Faustino Belenki, Martin Arron, Juan Gull, Francisco Cuello, Lucas Ezequiel Obregon, Ignacio Silva Fuentes, Tobias Ojea, Juan Ignacio Montoto, Agustin Ortlieb Basualdo, Nicolas Rodriguez, Nicolas Barceló Garcia, Fabricio Gabriel Cid.
Head coach: Gonzalo Iglesias.
