= South and Central America Handball Confederation =

Handball federation

South and Central America Handball Confederation (SCAHC) Spanish: Confederación Sur y Centro Americana de Balonmano (COSCABAL)
- Sport: Handball
- Other sports: Beach handball
- Official website: handballsca.com/es/

History
- Preceding organisations: Pan-American Team Handball Federation (1977 – 2019)
- Year of formation: April 5, 2019; 6 years ago at Cali, Colombia

Demographics
- Membership size: 19 members

Affiliations
- International federation: International Handball Federation (IHF)
- IHF member since: 2019

Governance
- President: Marcel Guido Mancilla Bravo (Chile)

Secretariat
- Address: Bombero Ossa 1010; of 302; Santiago Metropolitan Region
- Country: Chile
- Secretary General: Blas César Garcete Argüello (Paraguay)
- Managing Director: Salvio Sedréz (Brazil)
- Number of staff: 6

Regions
- South America; Central America

The South and Central America Handball Confederation (SCAHC) (Spanish: Confederación Sur y Centro Americana de Balonmano (COSCABAL)) is the governing body of the Olympic sport of Handball and Beach handball in South America and Central America. It is affiliated to the International Handball Federation (IHF).

SCAHC has 19 members countries located within the South America and Central America. One of IHF's six continental confederations, the SCAHC was formed officially on 5 April 2019 in Cali (Colombia). The SCAHC headquarter is located in Santiago de Chile (Chile).

== History ==
On 14 January 2018, during the IHF Council meeting, Pan-American Team Handball Federation was suspended by International Handball Federation and was divided into two continental confederations namely the North America and the Caribbean Handball Confederation and the South and Central America Handball Confederation. The IHF Council decision was taken on the facts that there are no signs of development in the level of handball and beach handball in the North American, Central American and the Caribbean countries. There was some development in South American level but that was also not comparable to the other continents like Europe, Asia and Africa. No team from Americas had ever reached to the semifinal stage of the IHF World Men's Handball Championship and the IHF Men's Junior World Championship till date. The PATHF appealed to the Court of Arbitration for Sport, and it annulled IHF's decision.

At the Extraordinary IHF Congress 2019 the IHF statues were revised to add the new federations.

== SCAHC Presidents ==
No.	Name	Country	Tenure
1	Marcel Guido Mancilla Bravo	Chile	1 July 2019 – Till date

== SCAHC Secretaries General ==
No.	Name	Country	Tenure
1	Blas César Garcete Argüello	Paraguay	1 July 2019 – Till date

== SCAHC Managing Director ==
No.	Name	Country	Tenure
1	Sálvio Sedréz	Brazil	1 July 2019 – Till date

== SCAHC Council ==
Following are the members serving 2019 – 2023 term.

Designation	Name	Country
President	Marcel Mancilla Bravo	Chile
1st Vice-president	Ricardo Souza	Brazil
2nd Vice-president	Juan Carlos Gutiérrez Vargas	Costa Rica
Secretary General	Blas César Garcete Argüello	Paraguay
Treasurer	Victor Manuel Ramos Vergara	Colombia
Chairman of Technical and Development Commission	Cecilia Hernández	El Salvador
Chairman of Competitions Commission	Martín Chilaca	Bolivia
Managing Director	Sálvio Sedréz	Brazil

== SCAHC members ==
South America

- Argentina
- Bolivia
- Brazil
- Chile
- Colombia
- Ecuador
- French Guiana
- Guyana ✝
- Paraguay
- Peru
- Uruguay
- Venezuela

Central America

- Belize ✝
- Costa Rica
- El Salvador
- Guatemala
- Honduras
- Nicaragua
- Panama
- ✝ means non-active member

== Tournaments ==
=== National teams ===
- South and Central American Men's Handball Championship
- South and Central American Women's Handball Championship
- South and Central American Men's Junior Handball Championship
- South and Central American Women's Junior Handball Championship
- South and Central American Men's Youth Handball Championship
- South and Central American Women's Youth Handball Championship
- Central American Handball Championship

=== Club ===
- South and Central American Men's Club Handball Championship
- South and Central American Women's Club Handball Championship
- South and Central American Junior Club Handball Championship

=== Beach ===
- South and Central American Beach Handball Championship
- South and Central American Club Beach Handball Championship
- South and Central American Youth Beach Handball Championship

== Current champions ==
	Men's	Women's
Senior Handball	Brazil (2024) (2*)	Brazil (2024) (4*)
Junior Handball	Argentina (2024) (2*)	Argentina (2023) (2*)
Youth Handball	Brazil (2024) (2*)	Brazil (2023) (2*)
Beach Handball	Brazil (2024) (3*)	Brazil (2024) (2*)
Club Handball	(Brazil) Handebol Taubaté (2024) (3*)	(Brazil) EC Pinheiros (2024) (3*)

(Titles) (*) Record titles
