= Argentina men's national youth handball team =

Argentina

Information
- Association: Argentina Handball Federation

Colours
1st	2nd

Results

IHF U-19 World Championship
- Appearances: 8 (First in 2005)
- Best result: 4th place : (2007)
- Last updated on Unknown.

The Argentina national youth handball team is the national under–18 handball team of Argentina. Controlled by the Argentinean Handball Confederation that is an affiliate of the International Handball Federation and also a part of the South and Central America Handball Confederation, the team represents the country in international matches.

== Statistics ==
=== Youth Olympic Games ===
Champions Runners up Third place Fourth place

Youth Olympic Games record
Year	Round	Position	GP	W	D	L	GS	GA	GD
(Singapore) 2010	Didn't Qualify								
(China) 2014	Didn't Qualify								
(Argentina) 2018	No Handball Event								
(Senegal) 2022	No Handball Event								
Total	0 / 2	0 Titles							

=== World Championship record ===
Champions Runners up Third place Fourth place

Year	Round	Position	GP	W	D*	L	GS	GA	GD
(Qatar) 2005		7th place							
(Bahrain) 2007		4th place							
(Tunisia) 2009		11th place							
(Argentina) 2011		10th place							
(Hungary) 2013		18th place							
(Russia) 2015		21st place							
(Georgia (country)) 2017		21st place							
(North Macedonia) 2019		14th place							
(Croatia) 2023		23rd place							
(Egypt) 2025		22nd place							
Total	11/11	0 Titles							

=== Youth South and Central American Championship record ===
Champions Runners up Third place Fourth place

Year	Round	Position	GP	W	D	L	GS	GA	GD
(Brazil) 2019	Round robin	Runner up	5	4	0	1	146	107	39
(Argentina) 2022	Final	Champion	5	5	0	0	176	92	84
(Nicaragua) 2024	Final	Runner up	5	4	0	1	173	98	75
Total	2/2	1 Title	15	13	0	2	495	297	198
