= 2019 South and Central American Men's Youth Handball Championship =

Tournament details
- Host country: Brazil
- Venue(s): 1 (in 1 host city)
- Dates: 8–12 May
- Teams: 6 (from 1 confederation)

Final positions
- Champions: Brazil (1st title)
- Runner-up: Argentina
- Third place: Chile
- Fourth place: Paraguay

Tournament statistics
- Matches played: 15
- Goals scored: 780 (52 per match)
- Top scorer(s): (Chile) Rodrigo Aedo (33 goals)

The 2019 South and Central American Men's Youth Handball Championship was the first edition of the tournament, took place in Taubaté, Brazil at the Ginásio EMECAL, from 8 to 12 May 2019. It acted as the South and Central American qualifying tournament for the 2019 Men's Youth World Handball Championship.

== Standings ==
Pos	Team	Pld	W	D	L	GF	GA	GD	Pts	Qualification
1st place, gold medalist(s)	Brazil (H)	5	5	0	0	172	101	+71	10	2019 Youth World Championship
2nd place, silver medalist(s)	Argentina	5	4	0	1	146	107	+39	8	2019 Youth World Championship
3rd place, bronze medalist(s)	Chile	5	3	0	2	144	115	+29	6	2019 Youth World Championship
4	Paraguay	5	2	0	3	115	144	−29	4	
5	Colombia	5	1	0	4	105	163	−58	2	
6	Uruguay	5	0	0	5	98	150	−52	0	

Rules for classification: 1) Points; 2) Head-to-head points; 3) Head-to-head goal difference; 4) Head-to-head goals scored; 5) Goal difference; 6) Goals scored; 7) Draw.
(H) Hosts

== Results ==
All times are local (UTC–3).

8 May 2019; 16:00	Uruguay	15–32	Argentina	Ginásio EMECAL, Taubaté; Attendance: 150; Referees: Oliveira, Vilela (BRA)
8 May 2019; 16:00	Rodríguez, Ruiz 3	(7–15)	Elst 6	Ginásio EMECAL, Taubaté; Attendance: 150; Referees: Oliveira, Vilela (BRA)
8 May 2019; 16:00	5× (suspension)	Report	1× (yellow card) 4× (suspension)	Ginásio EMECAL, Taubaté; Attendance: 150; Referees: Oliveira, Vilela (BRA)

8 May 2019; 18:15	Colombia	14–46	Brazil	Ginásio EMECAL, Taubaté
8 May 2019; 18:15		(6–19)		Ginásio EMECAL, Taubaté

8 May 2019; 20:30	Paraguay	25–32	Chile	Ginásio EMECAL, Taubaté
8 May 2019; 20:30		(12–16)		Ginásio EMECAL, Taubaté

9 May 2019; 16:00	Argentina	32–21	Colombia	Ginásio EMECAL, Taubaté; Attendance: 120; Referees: Corrêa, Corrêa (BRA)
9 May 2019; 16:00	J. Barceló 7	(16–10)	Belalcazar 7	Ginásio EMECAL, Taubaté; Attendance: 120; Referees: Corrêa, Corrêa (BRA)
9 May 2019; 16:00	2× (yellow card) 3× (suspension)	Report	3× (yellow card) 4× (suspension)	Ginásio EMECAL, Taubaté; Attendance: 120; Referees: Corrêa, Corrêa (BRA)

9 May 2019; 18:15	Brazil	32–20	Paraguay	Ginásio EMECAL, Taubaté
9 May 2019; 18:15		(15–9)		Ginásio EMECAL, Taubaté

9 May 2019; 20:30	Chile	35–17	Uruguay	Ginásio EMECAL, Taubaté
9 May 2019; 20:30		(16–10)		Ginásio EMECAL, Taubaté

10 May 2019; 16:00	Colombia	26–24	Uruguay	Ginásio EMECAL, Taubaté
10 May 2019; 16:00		(13–10)		Ginásio EMECAL, Taubaté

10 May 2019; 18:15	Brazil	28–24	Chile	Ginásio EMECAL, Taubaté
10 May 2019; 18:15		(12–15)		Ginásio EMECAL, Taubaté

10 May 2019; 20:30	Argentina	31–12	Paraguay	Ginásio EMECAL, Taubaté; Attendance: 150; Referees: Corrêa, Corrêa (BRA)
10 May 2019; 20:30	Pauloni 7	(13–6)	Lianes, Rojas 3	Ginásio EMECAL, Taubaté; Attendance: 150; Referees: Corrêa, Corrêa (BRA)
10 May 2019; 20:30	4× (yellow card) 4× (suspension)	Report	2× (yellow card) 5× (suspension)	Ginásio EMECAL, Taubaté; Attendance: 150; Referees: Corrêa, Corrêa (BRA)

11 May 2019; 16:00	Paraguay	28–23	Colombia	Ginásio EMECAL, Taubaté
11 May 2019; 16:00		(17–9)		Ginásio EMECAL, Taubaté

11 May 2019; 18:15	Brazil	27–16	Uruguay	Ginásio EMECAL, Taubaté
11 May 2019; 18:15		(13–9)		Ginásio EMECAL, Taubaté

11 May 2019; 20:30	Chile	20–24	Argentina	Ginásio EMECAL, Taubaté; Attendance: 180; Referees: Araújo, Perdomo (URU)
11 May 2019; 20:30	Aedo 5	(10–14)	Bravo, Unzner 4	Ginásio EMECAL, Taubaté; Attendance: 180; Referees: Araújo, Perdomo (URU)
11 May 2019; 20:30	2× (yellow card) 2× (suspension) 1× (red card)	Report	2× (yellow card) 3× (suspension)	Ginásio EMECAL, Taubaté; Attendance: 180; Referees: Araújo, Perdomo (URU)

12 May 2019; 14:00	Uruguay	26–30	Paraguay	Ginásio EMECAL, Taubaté
12 May 2019; 14:00		(13–13)		Ginásio EMECAL, Taubaté

12 May 2019; 16:15	Chile	33–21	Colombia	Ginásio EMECAL, Taubaté
12 May 2019; 16:15		(11–9)		Ginásio EMECAL, Taubaté

12 May 2019; 18:15	Argentina	27–39	Brazil	Ginásio EMECAL, Taubaté; Attendance: 500; Referees: Araújo, Perdomo (URU)
12 May 2019; 18:15	Bravo 5	(12–18)	Assumpção 8	Ginásio EMECAL, Taubaté; Attendance: 500; Referees: Araújo, Perdomo (URU)
12 May 2019; 18:15	2× (yellow card) 1× (suspension)	Report	2× (yellow card) 4× (suspension)	Ginásio EMECAL, Taubaté; Attendance: 500; Referees: Araújo, Perdomo (URU)
