= South and Central American Club Beach Handball Championship =

The South and Central American Club Beach Handball Championship is the official competition for Men's and Women's Beach handball clubs of the South and Central America Handball Confederation.

== Men ==
=== Summary ===
Year	Host	Final			Third place match		
Year	Host	Champion	Score	Runner-up	Third place	Score	Fourth place
2022; Details	(Argentina); Puerto Madryn	(Brazil); Niteroi Rugby	2–0	(Argentina); Panteras Patagones	(Argentina); Vicente López	2–0	Unión Argentina

== Medal table ==
=== Per Club ===
Rank	Club	Gold	Silver	Bronze	Total
1	(Brazil) Niteroi Rugby	1	0	0	1
2	(Argentina) Panteras Patagones	0	1	0	1
3	(Argentina) Vicente López	0	0	1	1
Totals (3 entries)		1	1	1	3

=== Per Nation ===
Rank	Nation	Gold	Silver	Bronze	Total
1	Brazil	1	0	0	1
2	Argentina	0	1	1	2
Totals (2 entries)		1	1	1	3

== Women ==
=== Summary ===
Year	Host	Final			Third place match		
Year	Host	Champion	Score	Runner-up	Third place	Score	Fourth place
2022; Details	(Argentina); Puerto Madryn	(Argentina); Avellaneda	2–0	(Argentina); IFES Fly Summer	(Argentina); Deportivo Goliat	2–1	(Argentina); Municipalidad de Viedma

== Medal table ==
=== Per Club ===
Rank	Club	Gold	Silver	Bronze	Total
1	(Argentina) Avellaneda	1	0	0	1
2	(Argentina) IFES Fly Summer	0	1	0	1
3	(Argentina) Deportivo Goliat	0	0	1	1
Totals (3 entries)		1	1	1	3

=== Per Nation ===
Rank	Nation	Gold	Silver	Bronze	Total
1	Argentina	1	1	1	3
Totals (1 entries)		1	1	1	3
