= Joaquín Barceló =

Cuban baseball player (born 1893)

- Pitcher
- Born: 1893; Caibarién, Cuba
- Died: Unknown
- Batted: Unknown Threw: Unknown

Negro league baseball debut
- 1921, for the All Cubans

Last appearance
- 1921, for the All Cubans

Negro league baseball statistics
- Win–loss record: 0–2
- Earned run average: 8.76
- Strikeouts: 4

Teams
- All Cubans (1921)

Joaquín Barceló (1893 – death date unknown) was a Cuban professional baseball pitcher who played in the Negro leagues in 1921.

A native of Caibarién, Cuba, Barceló played for the All Cubans in 1921. In two recorded games on the mound (both of which were starts), he posted an 0–2 win–loss record with an 8.76 earned run average (ERA) and four strikeouts over 12 1/3 innings.
