= Lucas Da Silva =

Portugal international rugby union player

- Born: 19 December 1997 (age 28)
- Height: 1.88 cm (1 in)
- Weight: 115 kg (254 lb)

Rugby union career
- Position: Hooker
- Current team: CA Brive
Senior career
Years	Team	Apps	(Points)
2017-2022	Stade Français		
2022-	CA Brive		

Lucas Da Silva (born 19 December 1997) is a French/Portuguese rugby union player who plays as a hooker for CA Brive.

== Club career ==
He is a youth product of the youth academy at Stade Français. He made his Top 14 debut for the club in 2017, appearing off the bench against Stade Toulousain. He made his first league start for the club in May 2019 against Racing 92. He went on to make 50 league appearances for Stade Français.

In 2022, he signed a two-year contract with CA Brive.

== International career ==
In November 2024, he was called-up to the senior Portugal national rugby union team.
