= 2024 South and Central American Men's Youth Handball Championship =

Tournament details
- Host country: Nicaragua
- Venue(s): 1 (in 1 host city)
- Dates: 5–9 November
- Teams: 8 (from 1 confederation)

Final positions
- Champions: Brazil (2nd title)
- Runner-up: Argentina
- Third place: Uruguay
- Fourth place: Chile

Tournament statistics
- Matches played: 20
- Goals scored: 1,095 (54.75 per match)

The 2024 South and Central American Men's Youth Handball Championship took place in Managua, Nicaragua, from 5 to 9 November 2024. It acted as the South and Central American qualifying tournament for the 2025 IHF Men's U19 Handball World Championship.

== Qualification ==
| Qualification | Host | Dates | Vacancies | Qualified |
|---|---|---|---|---|
| Automated entry | | | 4 | Argentina; Brazil; Chile; Uruguay |
| IHF Trophy South and Central America – Central American Zone | (Nicaragua) Managua | 16–20 April 2024 | 2 | Guatemala; Nicaragua |
| IHF Trophy South and Central America – South American Zone | (Colombia) Palmira | 23–27 April 2024 | 2 | Colombia; Paraguay |

== Preliminary round ==
All times are local (UTC–6).

=== Group A ===
| Pos | Team | Pld | W | D | L | GF | GA | GD | Pts | Qualification |
|---|---|---|---|---|---|---|---|---|---|---|
| 1 | Argentina | 3 | 3 | 0 | 0 | 125 | 58 | +67 | 6 | Semifinals |
| 2 | Uruguay | 3 | 2 | 0 | 1 | 99 | 81 | +18 | 4 | Semifinals |
| 3 | Nicaragua (H) | 3 | 1 | 0 | 2 | 90 | 122 | −32 | 2 | 5–8th place semifinals |
| 4 | Paraguay | 3 | 0 | 0 | 3 | 71 | 124 | −53 | 0 | 5–8th place semifinals |

Rules for classification: 1) Points; 2) Head-to-head points; 3) Head-to-head goal difference; 4) Head-to-head goals scored; 5) Goal difference; 6) Goals scored; 7) Draw.
(H) Hosts

| 5 November 2024; 19:00 | Argentina | 50–24 | Nicaragua | Polideportivo Alexis Argüello, Managua; Attendance: 80; Referees: Sepulveda, Leyton (CHI) |
| 5 November 2024; 19:00 | Medina 8 | (23–12) | O. López 7 | Polideportivo Alexis Argüello, Managua; Attendance: 80; Referees: Sepulveda, Leyton (CHI) |
| 5 November 2024; 19:00 | 5× (suspension) | Report | 1× (suspension) | Polideportivo Alexis Argüello, Managua; Attendance: 80; Referees: Sepulveda, Leyton (CHI) |

| 5 November 2024; 21:00 | Uruguay | 43–21 | Paraguay | Polideportivo Alexis Argüello, Managua; Attendance: 70; Referees: Bohoiavlenska, Molina (USA) |
| 5 November 2024; 21:00 | Carpineli 7 | (16–11) | Barrios, Vigo 4 | Polideportivo Alexis Argüello, Managua; Attendance: 70; Referees: Bohoiavlenska, Molina (USA) |
| 5 November 2024; 21:00 | 1× (suspension) | Report | 3× (suspension) | Polideportivo Alexis Argüello, Managua; Attendance: 70; Referees: Bohoiavlenska, Molina (USA) |

| 6 November 2024; 17:00 | Paraguay | 17–42 | Argentina | Polideportivo Alexis Argüello, Managua; Attendance: 80; Referees: Santana, Ramalho (BRA) |
| 6 November 2024; 17:00 | Martínez 6 | (7–18) | Lazcano 8 | Polideportivo Alexis Argüello, Managua; Attendance: 80; Referees: Santana, Ramalho (BRA) |
| 6 November 2024; 17:00 | 1× (yellow card) | Report | 1× (yellow card) 3× (suspension) | Polideportivo Alexis Argüello, Managua; Attendance: 80; Referees: Santana, Ramalho (BRA) |

| 6 November 2024; 19:00 | Nicaragua | 27–39 | Uruguay | Polideportivo Alexis Argüello, Managua; Attendance: 55; Referees: Bohoiavlenska, Molina (USA) |
| 6 November 2024; 19:00 | O. López, Sinclair 5 | (9–18) | González 6 | Polideportivo Alexis Argüello, Managua; Attendance: 55; Referees: Bohoiavlenska, Molina (USA) |
| 6 November 2024; 19:00 | 3× (suspension) | Report | 1× (yellow card) 3× (suspension) | Polideportivo Alexis Argüello, Managua; Attendance: 55; Referees: Bohoiavlenska, Molina (USA) |

| 7 November 2024; 17:00 | Argentina | 33–17 | Uruguay | Polideportivo Alexis Argüello, Managua; Attendance: 70; Referees: Gonçalves, Dezembro (BRA) |
| 7 November 2024; 17:00 | Colombo 6 | (15–5) | three players 3 | Polideportivo Alexis Argüello, Managua; Attendance: 70; Referees: Gonçalves, Dezembro (BRA) |
| 7 November 2024; 17:00 | 4× (suspension) | Report | 3× (suspension) | Polideportivo Alexis Argüello, Managua; Attendance: 70; Referees: Gonçalves, Dezembro (BRA) |

| 7 November 2024; 19:00 | Nicaragua | 39–33 | Paraguay | Polideportivo Alexis Argüello, Managua; Referees: Lenzue, Burgos (URU) |
| 7 November 2024; 19:00 | O. López 7 | (19–18) | Barrios, Ruiz 8 | Polideportivo Alexis Argüello, Managua; Referees: Lenzue, Burgos (URU) |
| 7 November 2024; 19:00 | 2× (suspension) | Report | 3× (suspension) | Polideportivo Alexis Argüello, Managua; Referees: Lenzue, Burgos (URU) |

=== Group B ===
| Pos | Team | Pld | W | D | L | GF | GA | GD | Pts | Qualification |
|---|---|---|---|---|---|---|---|---|---|---|
| 1 | Brazil | 3 | 3 | 0 | 0 | 110 | 43 | +67 | 6 | Semifinals |
| 2 | Chile | 3 | 2 | 0 | 1 | 74 | 57 | +17 | 4 | Semifinals |
| 3 | Colombia | 3 | 1 | 0 | 2 | 63 | 88 | −25 | 2 | 5–8th place semifinals |
| 4 | Guatemala | 3 | 0 | 0 | 3 | 55 | 114 | −59 | 0 | 5–8th place semifinals |

Rules for classification: 1) Points; 2) Head-to-head points; 3) Head-to-head goal difference; 4) Head-to-head goals scored; 5) Goal difference; 6) Goals scored; 7) Draw.

| 5 November 2024; 11:00 | Chile | 34–19 | Guatemala | Polideportivo Alexis Argüello, Managua; Attendance: 43; Referees: Petrone, Rueda (ARG) |
| 5 November 2024; 11:00 | Calderón 7 | (18–8) | Kreuzer 6 | Polideportivo Alexis Argüello, Managua; Attendance: 43; Referees: Petrone, Rueda (ARG) |
| 5 November 2024; 11:00 | 1× (suspension) | Report | 1× (suspension) | Polideportivo Alexis Argüello, Managua; Attendance: 43; Referees: Petrone, Rueda (ARG) |

| 5 November 2024; 13:00 | Brazil | 40–15 | Colombia | Polideportivo Alexis Argüello, Managua; Attendance: 59; Referees: Lenzue, Burgos (URU) |
| 5 November 2024; 13:00 | Silva 11 | (23–7) | Salazar 6 | Polideportivo Alexis Argüello, Managua; Attendance: 59; Referees: Lenzue, Burgos (URU) |
| 5 November 2024; 13:00 | | Report | | Polideportivo Alexis Argüello, Managua; Attendance: 59; Referees: Lenzue, Burgos (URU) |

| 6 November 2024; 11:00 | Guatemala | 9–49 | Brazil | Polideportivo Alexis Argüello, Managua; Attendance: 45; Referees: Sepulveda, Leyton (CHI) |
| 6 November 2024; 11:00 | Ortiz 3 | (2–21) | Silva 11 | Polideportivo Alexis Argüello, Managua; Attendance: 45; Referees: Sepulveda, Leyton (CHI) |
| 6 November 2024; 11:00 | 1× (suspension) | Report | | Polideportivo Alexis Argüello, Managua; Attendance: 45; Referees: Sepulveda, Leyton (CHI) |

| 6 November 2024; 13:00 | Colombia | 17–21 | Chile | Polideportivo Alexis Argüello, Managua; Attendance: 47; Referees: Gonçalves, Dezembro (BRA) |
| 6 November 2024; 13:00 | López, Salazar 6 | (8–9) | Ramos, Serrano 3 | Polideportivo Alexis Argüello, Managua; Attendance: 47; Referees: Gonçalves, Dezembro (BRA) |
| 6 November 2024; 13:00 | 3× (suspension) | Report | 1× (yellow card) 3× (suspension) | Polideportivo Alexis Argüello, Managua; Attendance: 47; Referees: Gonçalves, Dezembro (BRA) |

| 7 November 2024; 11:00 | Brazil | 21–19 | Chile | Polideportivo Alexis Argüello, Managua; Attendance: 42; Referees: Petrone, Rueda (ARG) |
| 7 November 2024; 11:00 | Borja 9 | (11–6) | Calderón, Verona 4 | Polideportivo Alexis Argüello, Managua; Attendance: 42; Referees: Petrone, Rueda (ARG) |
| 7 November 2024; 11:00 | 2× (suspension) | Report | 3× (suspension) | Polideportivo Alexis Argüello, Managua; Attendance: 42; Referees: Petrone, Rueda (ARG) |

| 7 November 2024; 13:00 | Colombia | 31–27 | Guatemala | Polideportivo Alexis Argüello, Managua; Attendance: 49; Referees: Gutiérrez, Aguilera (CHI) |
| 7 November 2024; 13:00 | M. Montoya 10 | (17–12) | Lemus, Ortiz 6 | Polideportivo Alexis Argüello, Managua; Attendance: 49; Referees: Gutiérrez, Aguilera (CHI) |
| 7 November 2024; 13:00 | 1× (yellow card) 1× (suspension) | Report | 7× (suspension) | Polideportivo Alexis Argüello, Managua; Attendance: 49; Referees: Gutiérrez, Aguilera (CHI) |

== Knockout stage ==
=== Bracket ===
Semi-finals
8 November
Argentina | 31
Chile | 21
8 November
Brazil | 21
Uruguay | 13

Final
9 November
Argentina | 17
Brazil | 19
Third place
9 November
Chile | 23
Uruguay | 24

5–8th place bracket

5–8th place semifinals
8 November
Nicaragua | 33
Guatemala | 26
8 November
Colombia | 28
Paraguay | 29

Fifth place
9 November
Nicaragua | 36
Paraguay | 33
Seventh place
9 November
Guatemala | 23
Colombia | 31

=== 5–8th place semifinals ===
| 8 November 2024; 11:00 | Nicaragua | 33–26 | Guatemala | Polideportivo Alexis Argüello, Managua; Attendance: 13; Referees: Sepulveda, Leyton (CHI) |
| 8 November 2024; 11:00 | Meza 8 | (13–13) | Guzmán, Lemus 5 | Polideportivo Alexis Argüello, Managua; Attendance: 13; Referees: Sepulveda, Leyton (CHI) |
| 8 November 2024; 11:00 | 6× (suspension) | Report | 4× (suspension) | Polideportivo Alexis Argüello, Managua; Attendance: 13; Referees: Sepulveda, Leyton (CHI) |

| 8 November 2024; 13:00 | Colombia | 28–29 | Paraguay | Polideportivo Alexis Argüello, Managua; Attendance: 49; Referees: Gutierrez, Aguilera (CHI) |
| 8 November 2024; 13:00 | López 10 | (14–14) | Duarte 5 | Polideportivo Alexis Argüello, Managua; Attendance: 49; Referees: Gutierrez, Aguilera (CHI) |
| 8 November 2024; 13:00 | 4× (suspension) | Report | 3× (suspension) | Polideportivo Alexis Argüello, Managua; Attendance: 49; Referees: Gutierrez, Aguilera (CHI) |

=== Semifinals ===
| 8 November 2024; 17:00 | Argentina | 31–21 | Chile | Polideportivo Alexis Argüello, Managua; Attendance: 70; Referees: Santana, Ramalho (BRA) |
| 8 November 2024; 17:00 | Pérez 6 | (16–9) | Venegas, Verona 4 | Polideportivo Alexis Argüello, Managua; Attendance: 70; Referees: Santana, Ramalho (BRA) |
| 8 November 2024; 17:00 | 2× (suspension) | Report | 3× (suspension) | Polideportivo Alexis Argüello, Managua; Attendance: 70; Referees: Santana, Ramalho (BRA) |

| 8 November 2024; 19:00 | Brazil | 21–13 | Uruguay | Polideportivo Alexis Argüello, Managua; Attendance: 75; Referees: Petrone, Rueda (ARG) |
| 8 November 2024; 19:00 | Siquieira, Suzuki 5 | (10–6) | Carpinelli 4 | Polideportivo Alexis Argüello, Managua; Attendance: 75; Referees: Petrone, Rueda (ARG) |
| 8 November 2024; 19:00 | 5× (suspension) 1× (red card) 1× | Report | 1× (yellow card) 1× (suspension) | Polideportivo Alexis Argüello, Managua; Attendance: 75; Referees: Petrone, Rueda (ARG) |

=== Seventh place game ===
| 9 November 2024; 11:00 | Guatemala | 23–31 | Colombia | Polideportivo Alexis Argüello, Managua; Attendance: 38; Referees: Burgos, Lenzue (URU) |
| 9 November 2024; 11:00 | Lemus 8 | (13–16) | M. Montoya 5 | Polideportivo Alexis Argüello, Managua; Attendance: 38; Referees: Burgos, Lenzue (URU) |
| 9 November 2024; 11:00 | 2× (suspension) | Report | 1× (yellow card) 2× (suspension) | Polideportivo Alexis Argüello, Managua; Attendance: 38; Referees: Burgos, Lenzue (URU) |

=== Fifth place game ===
| 9 November 2024; 13:00 | Nicaragua | 36–33 | Paraguay | Polideportivo Alexis Argüello, Managua; Attendance: 120; Referees: Bohoiavlenska, Molina (USA) |
| 9 November 2024; 13:00 | Ó. López 11 | (16–16) | Barrios 8 | Polideportivo Alexis Argüello, Managua; Attendance: 120; Referees: Bohoiavlenska, Molina (USA) |
| 9 November 2024; 13:00 | 1× (suspension) 1× (red card) | Report | 2× (suspension) | Polideportivo Alexis Argüello, Managua; Attendance: 120; Referees: Bohoiavlenska, Molina (USA) |

=== Third place game ===
| 9 November 2024; 17:00 | Chile | 23–24 | Uruguay | Polideportivo Alexis Argüello, Managua; Attendance: 102; Referees: Gonçalves, Dezembro (BRA) |
| 9 November 2024; 17:00 | Castillo 8 | (14–12) | four players 4 | Polideportivo Alexis Argüello, Managua; Attendance: 102; Referees: Gonçalves, Dezembro (BRA) |
| 9 November 2024; 17:00 | 1× (suspension) | Report | 4× (suspension) | Polideportivo Alexis Argüello, Managua; Attendance: 102; Referees: Gonçalves, Dezembro (BRA) |

=== Final ===
| 9 November 2024; 19:00 | Argentina | 17–19 | Brazil | Polideportivo Alexis Argüello, Managua; Attendance: 130; Referees: Gutiérrez, Aguilera (CHI) |
| 9 November 2024; 19:00 | Torossian 6 | (6–7) | Siqueira 7 | Polideportivo Alexis Argüello, Managua; Attendance: 130; Referees: Gutiérrez, Aguilera (CHI) |
| 9 November 2024; 19:00 | 1× (yellow card) 3× (suspension) | Report | 1× (yellow card) 5× (suspension) 1× (red card) | Polideportivo Alexis Argüello, Managua; Attendance: 130; Referees: Gutiérrez, Aguilera (CHI) |

== Final standing ==
| Rank | Team |
|---|---|
| 1st place, gold medalist(s) | Brazil |
| 2nd place, silver medalist(s) | Argentina |
| 3rd place, bronze medalist(s) | Uruguay |
| 4 | Chile |
| 5 | Nicaragua |
| 6 | Paraguay |
| 7 | Colombia |
| 8 | Guatemala |

| Qualified for the 2025 Men's U19 World Championship |
| Qualified for the 2025 IHF Inter-Continental Trophy |
