= Brazil men's national youth handball team =

Brazil

Information
- Association: Brazil Handball Federation

Colours
1st	2nd

Results

IHF U-19 World Championship
- Appearances: 7 (First in 2007)
- Best result: 8th place : (2015)
- Last updated on Unknown.

The Brazil national youth handball team is the national under–18 handball team of Brazil. Controlled by the Brazilian Handball Confederation, that is an affiliate of the International Handball Federation IHF and also a part of the South and Central America Handball Confederation SCAHC. The team represents the country in international matches.

== Statistics ==
=== Youth Olympic Games ===
Champions Runners up Third place Fourth place

Youth Olympic Games record
Year	Round	Position	GP	W	D	L	GS	GA	GD
(Singapore) 2010		4th place							
(China) 2014		5th place							
(Argentina) 2018	No Handball Event								
(Senegal) 2022	No Handball Event								
Total	2 / 2	0 Titles							

=== World Championship record ===
Champions Runners up Third place Fourth place

Year	Round	Position	GP	W	D*	L	GS	GA	GD
(Qatar) 2005	Didn't Qualify								
(Bahrain) 2007		9th place							
(Tunisia) 2009		15th place							
(Argentina) 2011		12th place							
(Hungary) 2013		9th place							
(Russia) 2015		8th place							
(Georgia (country)) 2017		19th place							
(North Macedonia) 2019		21st place							
(Croatia) 2023		14th place							
(Egypt) 2025		21st place							
Total	9/10	0 Titles							

=== Youth South and Central American Championship record ===
Champions Runners up Third place Fourth place

Year	Round	Position	GP	W	D	L	GS	GA	GD
(Brazil) 2019	Round robin	Champion	5	5	0	0	172	101	71
(Argentina) 2022	Final	Runner up	5	4	0	1	177	89	88
(Nicaragua) 2024	Final	Champion	5	5	0	0	150	73	77
Total	3/3	2 Titles	15	14	0	1	499	263	236
