= 2027 IHF Men's U19 Handball World Championship =

Tournament details
- Venue: 1 (in 1 host city)
- Dates: 29 July – 9 August
- Teams: 32 (from 5 confederations)

The 2027 IHF Men's U19 Handball World Championship will be the 12th edition of the IHF Men's U19 Handball World Championship to be held in a country yet to be determined, under the aegis of International Handball Federation (IHF) from 29 July to 9 August 2027.

== Qualification ==
Event	Host	Dates	Vacancies	Qualified
IHF Council Meeting			1	
U17 World Champion	24 October – 1 November 2025	(Morocco) Casablanca	1	Germany
2026 U-18 European Championship	29 July – 9 August 2026	(Serbia) Belgrade	14	Austria; Croatia; Denmark; France; Hungary; Iceland; Israel; North Macedonia; Poland; Portugal; Serbia; Slovenia; Spain; Sweden
2026 Asian Youth Championship	20–31 August 2026	(Jordan) Amman	4	Bahrain; Iran; Qatar; South Korea
2026 African Youth Championship	15–22 September 2026	(Ivory Coast) Abidjan	5	Cameroon; Egypt; Guinea; Morocco; Tunisia
2026 North America and Caribbean Youth Championship	6–10 October 2026	(Puerto Rico) Salinas	2	Canada; United States
2026 South and Central American Youth Championship	10–14 November 2026	(Paraguay) Asunción	3	Argentina; Brazil; Chile
Wildcard		—	1	
IHF Trophy Inter-Continental Phase			1	
