= 2021 European Men's U-19 Handball Championship =

European Men's U-18 Handball Championship

Tournament details
- Host country: Croatia
- Venue(s): 2 (in 2 host cities)
- Dates: 12–22 August
- Teams: 16 (from 1 confederation)

Final positions
- Champions: Germany (3rd title)
- Runners-up: Croatia
- Third place: Spain
- Fourth place: Slovenia

Tournament statistics
- Matches played: 56
- Goals scored: 3,216 (57.43 per match)
- Attendance: 8,185 (146 per match)
- Top scorer(s): (Slovenia) Mitja Janc (Sweden) Elliot Stenmalm (61 goals)

Awards
- Best player: (Slovenia) Mitja Janc

The 2021 European Men's U-19 Handball Championship was the 15th edition of the European Men's U-18 Handball Championship, which was held in Varaždin and Koprivnica, Croatia from 12 to 22 August 2021.

The European Handball Federation decided to hold an U-19 European Championship in 2021 in a move to lessen the COVID-19 pandemic’s impact for national team players born in 2002 and younger.

== Qualification ==
| Competition | Dates | Host | Vacancies | Qualified |
|---|---|---|---|---|
| Men's 18 EHF EURO 2018 | 9–19 August 2018 | Croatia | 14 | Sweden; Iceland; Denmark; Croatia; Spain; Germany; France; Serbia; Slovenia; Hungary; Norway; Portugal; Russia; Israel |
| Men's 18 EHF Championship 2018 | 10–18 August 2018 | (Austria) Tulln | 1 | Austria |
| Men's 18 EHF Championship 2018 | 10–18 August 2018 | (Georgia (country)) Tbilisi | 1 | Italy |

== Draw ==
| Pot 1 | Pot 2 | Pot 3 | Pot 4 |
|---|---|---|---|
| Croatia; Denmark; Iceland; Sweden | France; Germany; Serbia; Spain | Hungary; Norway; Portugal; Slovenia | Austria; Israel; Italy; Russia |

== Preliminary round ==
All times are local (UTC+2).

=== Group A ===
| Pos | Team | Pld | W | D | L | GF | GA | GD | Pts | Qualification |
|---|---|---|---|---|---|---|---|---|---|---|
| 1 | Slovenia | 3 | 2 | 0 | 1 | 87 | 87 | 0 | 4 (Note: Iceland 22–26 Slovenia) | Main round |
| 2 | Iceland | 3 | 2 | 0 | 1 | 83 | 73 | +10 | 4 | Main round |
| 3 | Italy | 3 | 1 | 0 | 2 | 74 | 87 | −13 | 2 (Note: Serbia 26–28 Italy) | Intermediate round |
| 4 | Serbia | 3 | 1 | 0 | 2 | 92 | 89 | +3 | 2 | Intermediate round |

Source: EHF
Rules for classification: 1) points; 2) head-to-head points; 3) head-to-head goal difference; 4) head-to-head number of goals scored; 5) goal difference.
Notes:

| 12 August 2021; 14:30 | Iceland | 22–26 | Slovenia | Varaždin Arena, Varaždin; Attendance: 56; Referees: Lončar, Lončar (CRO) |
| 12 August 2021; 14:30 | Guðjónsson, Óskarsson 4 | (8–14) | Janc 10 | Varaždin Arena, Varaždin; Attendance: 56; Referees: Lončar, Lončar (CRO) |
| 12 August 2021; 14:30 | 2× (yellow card) 9× (suspension) 1× (red card) | Report | 1× (yellow card) 7× (suspension) | Varaždin Arena, Varaždin; Attendance: 56; Referees: Lončar, Lončar (CRO) |

| 12 August 2021; 16:30 | Serbia | 26–28 | Italy | Varaždin Arena, Varaždin; Attendance: 50; Referees: Bolic, Hurich (AUT) |
| 12 August 2021; 16:30 | Zečević 9 | (13–13) | Bortoli 9 | Varaždin Arena, Varaždin; Attendance: 50; Referees: Bolic, Hurich (AUT) |
| 12 August 2021; 16:30 | 1× (yellow card) 9× (suspension) | Report | 1× (yellow card) 2× (suspension) | Varaždin Arena, Varaždin; Attendance: 50; Referees: Bolic, Hurich (AUT) |

| 13 August 2021; 14:30 | Italy | 17–30 | Iceland | Varaždin Arena, Varaždin; Attendance: 30; Referees: Stokes, Bartlett (GBR) |
| 13 August 2021; 14:30 | Bortoli 6 | (8–12) | Ástþórsson 6 | Varaždin Arena, Varaždin; Attendance: 30; Referees: Stokes, Bartlett (GBR) |
| 13 August 2021; 14:30 | 1× (suspension) | Report | 3× (suspension) | Varaždin Arena, Varaždin; Attendance: 30; Referees: Stokes, Bartlett (GBR) |

| 13 August 2021; 16:30 | Slovenia | 30–36 | Serbia | Varaždin Arena, Varaždin; Attendance: 150; Referees: Martins, Martins (POR) |
| 13 August 2021; 16:30 | Janc 9 | (15–15) | Zečević 7 | Varaždin Arena, Varaždin; Attendance: 150; Referees: Martins, Martins (POR) |
| 13 August 2021; 16:30 | 1× (yellow card) 4× (suspension) 1× (red card) | Report | 1× (yellow card) 9× (suspension) 1× (red card) | Varaždin Arena, Varaždin; Attendance: 150; Referees: Martins, Martins (POR) |

| 15 August 2021; 14:30 | Iceland | 31–30 | Serbia | Varaždin Arena, Varaždin; Attendance: 50; Referees: Bolic, Hurich (AUT) |
| 15 August 2021; 14:30 | Ástþórsson, Rúnarsson 6 | (13–14) | S. Dodić, Zečević 5 | Varaždin Arena, Varaždin; Attendance: 50; Referees: Bolic, Hurich (AUT) |
| 15 August 2021; 14:30 | 2× (yellow card) 4× (suspension) | Report | 6× (suspension) | Varaždin Arena, Varaždin; Attendance: 50; Referees: Bolic, Hurich (AUT) |

| 15 August 2021; 16:30 | Slovenia | 31–29 | Italy | Varaždin Arena, Varaždin; Attendance: 93; Referees: Kinnari, Skogberg (FIN) |
| 15 August 2021; 16:30 | Janc 13 | (14–16) | Gai 6 | Varaždin Arena, Varaždin; Attendance: 93; Referees: Kinnari, Skogberg (FIN) |
| 15 August 2021; 16:30 | 7× (suspension) | Report | 1× (yellow card) 4× (suspension) 1× (red card) | Varaždin Arena, Varaždin; Attendance: 93; Referees: Kinnari, Skogberg (FIN) |

=== Group B ===
| Pos | Team | Pld | W | D | L | GF | GA | GD | Pts | Qualification |
|---|---|---|---|---|---|---|---|---|---|---|
| 1 | Spain | 3 | 2 | 1 | 0 | 98 | 85 | +13 | 5 (Note: Sweden 35–35 Spain) | Main round |
| 2 | Sweden | 3 | 2 | 1 | 0 | 100 | 95 | +5 | 5 | Main round |
| 3 | Hungary | 3 | 1 | 0 | 2 | 97 | 92 | +5 | 2 | Intermediate round |
| 4 | Israel | 3 | 0 | 0 | 3 | 75 | 98 | −23 | 0 | Intermediate round |

Source: EHF
Rules for classification: 1) points; 2) head-to-head points; 3) head-to-head goal difference; 4) head-to-head number of goals scored; 5) goal difference.
Notes:

| 12 August 2021; 18:30 | Sweden | 36–35 | Hungary | Varaždin Arena, Varaždin; Attendance: 67; Referees: Konjičanin, Konjičanin (BIH) |
| 12 August 2021; 18:30 | Stenmalm 13 | (19–17) | Zoran Ilić 9 | Varaždin Arena, Varaždin; Attendance: 67; Referees: Konjičanin, Konjičanin (BIH) |
| 12 August 2021; 18:30 | 6× (suspension) | Report | 6× (suspension) | Varaždin Arena, Varaždin; Attendance: 67; Referees: Konjičanin, Konjičanin (BIH) |

| 12 August 2021; 20:30 | Spain | 34–23 | Israel | Varaždin Arena, Varaždin; Attendance: 50; Referees: Stokes, Bartlett (GBR) |
| 12 August 2021; 20:30 | Gurri 6 | (18–15) | Maman 7 | Varaždin Arena, Varaždin; Attendance: 50; Referees: Stokes, Bartlett (GBR) |
| 12 August 2021; 20:30 | 2× (yellow card) 4× (suspension) | Report | 1× (yellow card) 8× (suspension) | Varaždin Arena, Varaždin; Attendance: 50; Referees: Stokes, Bartlett (GBR) |

| 13 August 2021; 18:30 | Israel | 25–29 | Sweden | Varaždin Arena, Varaždin; Attendance: 78; Referees: Kinnari, Skogberg (FIN) |
| 13 August 2021; 18:30 | Levi 6 | (11–16) | Stenmalm 12 | Varaždin Arena, Varaždin; Attendance: 78; Referees: Kinnari, Skogberg (FIN) |
| 13 August 2021; 18:30 | 2× (yellow card) 7× (suspension) | Report | 1× (yellow card) 3× (suspension) 1× (red card) | Varaždin Arena, Varaždin; Attendance: 78; Referees: Kinnari, Skogberg (FIN) |

| 13 August 2021; 20:30 | Hungary | 27–29 | Spain | Varaždin Arena, Varaždin; Attendance: 150; Referees: Lončar, Lončar (CRO) |
| 13 August 2021; 20:30 | Fazekas 10 | (14–13) | Gurri 8 | Varaždin Arena, Varaždin; Attendance: 150; Referees: Lončar, Lončar (CRO) |
| 13 August 2021; 20:30 | 2× (yellow card) 6× (suspension) | Report | 1× (yellow card) 5× (suspension) | Varaždin Arena, Varaždin; Attendance: 150; Referees: Lončar, Lončar (CRO) |

| 15 August 2021; 18:30 | Sweden | 35–35 | Spain | Varaždin Arena, Varaždin; Attendance: 100; Referees: Lončar, Lončar (CRO) |
| 15 August 2021; 18:30 | Stenmalm 14 | (14–19) | Gurri, Fernández 6 | Varaždin Arena, Varaždin; Attendance: 100; Referees: Lončar, Lončar (CRO) |
| 15 August 2021; 18:30 | 1× (yellow card) 4× (suspension) | Report | 6× (suspension) | Varaždin Arena, Varaždin; Attendance: 100; Referees: Lončar, Lončar (CRO) |

| 15 August 2021; 20:30 | Hungary | 35–27 | Israel | Varaždin Arena, Varaždin; Attendance: 25; Referees: Martins, Martins (POR) |
| 15 August 2021; 20:30 | Pergel 9 | (17–12) | Levi 8 | Varaždin Arena, Varaždin; Attendance: 25; Referees: Martins, Martins (POR) |
| 15 August 2021; 20:30 | 2× (suspension) | Report | 1× (yellow card) 4× (suspension) | Varaždin Arena, Varaždin; Attendance: 25; Referees: Martins, Martins (POR) |

=== Group C ===
| Pos | Team | Pld | W | D | L | GF | GA | GD | Pts | Qualification |
|---|---|---|---|---|---|---|---|---|---|---|
| 1 | Denmark | 3 | 2 | 1 | 0 | 96 | 74 | +22 | 5 (Note: Denmark 29–29 Germany) | Main round |
| 2 | Germany | 3 | 2 | 1 | 0 | 91 | 77 | +14 | 5 | Main round |
| 3 | Norway | 3 | 1 | 0 | 2 | 69 | 80 | −11 | 2 | Intermediate round |
| 4 | Russia | 3 | 0 | 0 | 3 | 77 | 102 | −25 | 0 | Intermediate round |

Source: EHF
Rules for classification: 1) points; 2) head-to-head points; 3) head-to-head goal difference; 4) head-to-head number of goals scored; 5) goal difference.
Notes:

| 12 August 2021; 14:15 | Denmark | 29–19 | Norway | Gymnasium Fran Galović Sports Hall, Koprivnica; Attendance: 100; Referees: Aghakishi, Aghakishi (AZE) |
| 12 August 2021; 14:15 | Als, Termansen 4 | (16–8) | three players 4 | Gymnasium Fran Galović Sports Hall, Koprivnica; Attendance: 100; Referees: Aghakishi, Aghakishi (AZE) |
| 12 August 2021; 14:15 | 5× (suspension) | Report | 1× (yellow card) 3× (suspension) | Gymnasium Fran Galović Sports Hall, Koprivnica; Attendance: 100; Referees: Aghakishi, Aghakishi (AZE) |

| 12 August 2021; 16:15 | Germany | 35–27 | Russia | Gymnasium Fran Galović Sports Hall, Koprivnica; Attendance: 95; Referees: Metalari, Nikolovski (MKD) |
| 12 August 2021; 16:15 | Heitkamp 9 | (15–10) | Dmitriev 7 | Gymnasium Fran Galović Sports Hall, Koprivnica; Attendance: 95; Referees: Metalari, Nikolovski (MKD) |
| 12 August 2021; 16:15 | 4× (suspension) | Report | 2× (suspension) | Gymnasium Fran Galović Sports Hall, Koprivnica; Attendance: 95; Referees: Metalari, Nikolovski (MKD) |

| 13 August 2021; 14:30 | Russia | 26–38 | Denmark | Gymnasium Fran Galović Sports Hall, Koprivnica; Attendance: 200; Referees: Konjičanin, Konjičanin (BIH) |
| 13 August 2021; 14:30 | Kandybin 9 | (13–19) | Boldsen 7 | Gymnasium Fran Galović Sports Hall, Koprivnica; Attendance: 200; Referees: Konjičanin, Konjičanin (BIH) |
| 13 August 2021; 14:30 | 3× (suspension) | Report | 6× (suspension) | Gymnasium Fran Galović Sports Hall, Koprivnica; Attendance: 200; Referees: Konjičanin, Konjičanin (BIH) |

| 13 August 2021; 16:30 | Norway | 21–27 | Germany | Gymnasium Fran Galović Sports Hall, Koprivnica; Attendance: 100; Referees: Covalciuc, Covalciuc (MDA) |
| 13 August 2021; 16:30 | Haug 8 | (10–15) | Uščins 10 | Gymnasium Fran Galović Sports Hall, Koprivnica; Attendance: 100; Referees: Covalciuc, Covalciuc (MDA) |
| 13 August 2021; 16:30 | 1× (yellow card) 4× (suspension) | Report | 4× (suspension) | Gymnasium Fran Galović Sports Hall, Koprivnica; Attendance: 100; Referees: Covalciuc, Covalciuc (MDA) |

| 15 August 2021; 14:30 | Denmark | 29–29 | Germany | Gymnasium Fran Galović Sports Hall, Koprivnica; Attendance: 100; Referees: Boričić, Marković (SRB) |
| 15 August 2021; 14:30 | T. Arnoldsen 7 | (16–14) | Uščins 10 | Gymnasium Fran Galović Sports Hall, Koprivnica; Attendance: 100; Referees: Boričić, Marković (SRB) |
| 15 August 2021; 14:30 | 1× (yellow card) 8× (suspension) 2× (red card) | Report | 1× (yellow card) 7× (suspension) | Gymnasium Fran Galović Sports Hall, Koprivnica; Attendance: 100; Referees: Boričić, Marković (SRB) |

| 15 August 2021; 16:30 | Norway | 29–24 | Russia | Gymnasium Fran Galović Sports Hall, Koprivnica; Attendance: 100; Referees: Metalari, Nikolovski (MKD) |
| 15 August 2021; 16:30 | Haug 9 | (14–12) | Kandybin 9 | Gymnasium Fran Galović Sports Hall, Koprivnica; Attendance: 100; Referees: Metalari, Nikolovski (MKD) |
| 15 August 2021; 16:30 | 2× (suspension) | Report | 1× (yellow card) 5× (suspension) | Gymnasium Fran Galović Sports Hall, Koprivnica; Attendance: 100; Referees: Metalari, Nikolovski (MKD) |

=== Group D ===
| Pos | Team | Pld | W | D | L | GF | GA | GD | Pts | Qualification |
|---|---|---|---|---|---|---|---|---|---|---|
| 1 | Croatia (H) | 3 | 3 | 0 | 0 | 98 | 83 | +15 | 6 | Main round |
| 2 | Portugal | 3 | 2 | 0 | 1 | 103 | 90 | +13 | 4 | Main round |
| 3 | France | 3 | 1 | 0 | 2 | 83 | 79 | +4 | 2 | Intermediate round |
| 4 | Austria | 3 | 0 | 0 | 3 | 80 | 112 | −32 | 0 | Intermediate round |

Source: EHF
Rules for classification: 1) points; 2) head-to-head points; 3) head-to-head goal difference; 4) head-to-head number of goals scored; 5) goal difference.
(H) Hosts

| 12 August 2021; 18:15 | France | 32–24 | Austria | Gymnasium Fran Galović Sports Hall, Koprivnica; Attendance: 200; Referees: Boričić, Marković (SRB) |
| 12 August 2021; 18:15 | Vincent 7 | (15–14) | Jankovic 6 | Gymnasium Fran Galović Sports Hall, Koprivnica; Attendance: 200; Referees: Boričić, Marković (SRB) |
| 12 August 2021; 18:15 | 1× (yellow card) 7× (suspension) | Report | 1× (yellow card) 6× (suspension) | Gymnasium Fran Galović Sports Hall, Koprivnica; Attendance: 200; Referees: Boričić, Marković (SRB) |

| 12 August 2021; 20:15 | Croatia | 35–31 | Portugal | Gymnasium Fran Galović Sports Hall, Koprivnica; Attendance: 200; Referees: Covalciuc, Covalciuc (MDA) |
| 12 August 2021; 20:15 | Barbić 10 | (17–15) | F. Costa 6 | Gymnasium Fran Galović Sports Hall, Koprivnica; Attendance: 200; Referees: Covalciuc, Covalciuc (MDA) |
| 12 August 2021; 20:15 | 1× (yellow card) 4× (suspension) | Report | 2× (suspension) | Gymnasium Fran Galović Sports Hall, Koprivnica; Attendance: 200; Referees: Covalciuc, Covalciuc (MDA) |

| 13 August 2021; 18:30 | Portugal | 29–26 | France | Gymnasium Fran Galović Sports Hall, Koprivnica; Attendance: 200; Referees: Metalari, Nikolovski (MKD) |
| 13 August 2021; 18:30 | F. Costa 13 | (11–11) | Fadhuile-Crépy 11 | Gymnasium Fran Galović Sports Hall, Koprivnica; Attendance: 200; Referees: Metalari, Nikolovski (MKD) |
| 13 August 2021; 18:30 | 3× (suspension) | Report | 1× (yellow card) 6× (suspension) 1× (red card) | Gymnasium Fran Galović Sports Hall, Koprivnica; Attendance: 200; Referees: Metalari, Nikolovski (MKD) |

| 13 August 2021; 20:30 | Austria | 27–37 | Croatia | Gymnasium Fran Galović Sports Hall, Koprivnica; Attendance: 250; Referees: Aghakishi, Aghakishi (AZE) |
| 13 August 2021; 20:30 | Magelinskas 6 | (14–19) | Božičević 9 | Gymnasium Fran Galović Sports Hall, Koprivnica; Attendance: 250; Referees: Aghakishi, Aghakishi (AZE) |
| 13 August 2021; 20:30 | 2× (yellow card) 4× (suspension) | Report | 5× (suspension) | Gymnasium Fran Galović Sports Hall, Koprivnica; Attendance: 250; Referees: Aghakishi, Aghakishi (AZE) |

| 15 August 2021; 18:30 | Portugal | 43–29 | Austria | Gymnasium Fran Galović Sports Hall, Koprivnica; Attendance: 100; Referees: Konjičanin, Konjičanin (BIH) |
| 15 August 2021; 18:30 | Cavalcanti 9 | (23–14) | Pieber 6 | Gymnasium Fran Galović Sports Hall, Koprivnica; Attendance: 100; Referees: Konjičanin, Konjičanin (BIH) |
| 15 August 2021; 18:30 | 1× (yellow card) 6× (suspension) | Report | 5× (suspension) | Gymnasium Fran Galović Sports Hall, Koprivnica; Attendance: 100; Referees: Konjičanin, Konjičanin (BIH) |

| 15 August 2021; 20:30 | Croatia | 26–25 | France | Gymnasium Fran Galović Sports Hall, Koprivnica; Attendance: 350; Referees: Covalciuc, Covalciuc (MDA) |
| 15 August 2021; 20:30 | Grubišić 9 | (13–13) | Derisbourg 10 | Gymnasium Fran Galović Sports Hall, Koprivnica; Attendance: 350; Referees: Covalciuc, Covalciuc (MDA) |
| 15 August 2021; 20:30 | 5× (suspension) 1× (red card) | Report | 1× (yellow card) 2× (suspension) | Gymnasium Fran Galović Sports Hall, Koprivnica; Attendance: 350; Referees: Covalciuc, Covalciuc (MDA) |

== Intermediate round ==
=== Group III ===
| Pos | Team | Pld | W | D | L | GF | GA | GD | Pts | Qualification |
|---|---|---|---|---|---|---|---|---|---|---|
| 1 | Hungary | 3 | 3 | 0 | 0 | 94 | 74 | +20 | 6 | 9–12th place semifinals |
| 2 | Italy | 3 | 2 | 0 | 1 | 78 | 77 | +1 | 4 | 9–12th place semifinals |
| 3 | Israel | 3 | 1 | 0 | 2 | 85 | 92 | −7 | 2 | 13–16th place semifinals |
| 4 | Serbia | 3 | 0 | 0 | 3 | 80 | 94 | −14 | 0 | 13–16th place semifinals |

Source: EHF
Rules for classification: 1) points; 2) head-to-head points; 3) head-to-head goal difference; 4) head-to-head number of goals scored; 5) goal difference.

| 17 August 2021; 14:30 | Serbia | 28–35 | Israel | Varaždin Arena, Varaždin; Attendance: 50; Referees: Aghakishi, Aghakishi (AZE) |
| 17 August 2021; 14:30 | S. Dodić, Zečević 7 | (14–18) | Cohen 10 | Varaždin Arena, Varaždin; Attendance: 50; Referees: Aghakishi, Aghakishi (AZE) |
| 17 August 2021; 14:30 | 1× (yellow card) 10× (suspension) | Report | 9× (suspension) | Varaždin Arena, Varaždin; Attendance: 50; Referees: Aghakishi, Aghakishi (AZE) |

| 17 August 2021; 16:30 | Italy | 21–28 | Hungary | Varaždin Arena, Varaždin; Attendance: 21; Referees: Martins, Martins (POR) |
| 17 August 2021; 16:30 | four players 4 | (9–14) | Lukács 6 | Varaždin Arena, Varaždin; Attendance: 21; Referees: Martins, Martins (POR) |
| 17 August 2021; 16:30 | 1× (suspension) | Report | 7× (suspension) | Varaždin Arena, Varaždin; Attendance: 21; Referees: Martins, Martins (POR) |

| 18 August 2021; 14:30 | Israel | 23–29 | Italy | Varaždin Arena, Varaždin; Attendance: 30; Referees: Stokes, Bartlett (GBR) |
| 18 August 2021; 14:30 | Cohen 8 | (12–16) | Bortoli 12 | Varaždin Arena, Varaždin; Attendance: 30; Referees: Stokes, Bartlett (GBR) |
| 18 August 2021; 14:30 | 1× (yellow card) 6× (suspension) | Report | 4× (suspension) | Varaždin Arena, Varaždin; Attendance: 30; Referees: Stokes, Bartlett (GBR) |

| 18 August 2021; 16:30 | Hungary | 31–26 | Serbia | Varaždin Arena, Varaždin; Attendance: 50; Referees: Bolic, Hurich (AUT) |
| 18 August 2021; 16:30 | Imre 7 | (15–13) | Mitrović, Rogan 5 | Varaždin Arena, Varaždin; Attendance: 50; Referees: Bolic, Hurich (AUT) |
| 18 August 2021; 16:30 | 3× (suspension) | Report | 3× (suspension) | Varaždin Arena, Varaždin; Attendance: 50; Referees: Bolic, Hurich (AUT) |

=== Group IV ===
| Pos | Team | Pld | W | D | L | GF | GA | GD | Pts | Qualification |
|---|---|---|---|---|---|---|---|---|---|---|
| 1 | France | 3 | 3 | 0 | 0 | 98 | 59 | +39 | 6 | 9–12th place semifinals |
| 2 | Norway | 3 | 2 | 0 | 1 | 76 | 80 | −4 | 4 | 9–12th place semifinals |
| 3 | Austria | 3 | 1 | 0 | 2 | 86 | 80 | +6 | 2 | 13–16th place semifinals |
| 4 | Russia | 3 | 0 | 0 | 3 | 60 | 101 | −41 | 0 | 13–16th place semifinals |

Source: EHF
Rules for classification: 1) points; 2) head-to-head points; 3) head-to-head goal difference; 4) head-to-head number of goals scored; 5) goal difference.

| 17 August 2021; 14:30 | Russia | 19–36 | Austria | Gymnasium Fran Galović Sports Hall, Koprivnica; Attendance: 100; Referees: Stokes, Bartlett (GBR) |
| 17 August 2021; 14:30 | Kandybin 5 | (11–18) | Magelinskas 8 | Gymnasium Fran Galović Sports Hall, Koprivnica; Attendance: 100; Referees: Stokes, Bartlett (GBR) |
| 17 August 2021; 14:30 | 3× (suspension) | Report | 5× (suspension) | Gymnasium Fran Galović Sports Hall, Koprivnica; Attendance: 100; Referees: Stokes, Bartlett (GBR) |

| 17 August 2021; 16:30 | Norway | 18–30 | France | Gymnasium Fran Galović Sports Hall, Koprivnica; Attendance: 100; Referees: Boričić, Marković (SRB) |
| 17 August 2021; 16:30 | Berg 5 | (7–16) | Pimenta 9 | Gymnasium Fran Galović Sports Hall, Koprivnica; Attendance: 100; Referees: Boričić, Marković (SRB) |
| 17 August 2021; 16:30 | 2× (yellow card) 3× (suspension) | Report | 1× (suspension) | Gymnasium Fran Galović Sports Hall, Koprivnica; Attendance: 100; Referees: Boričić, Marković (SRB) |

| 18 August 2021; 14:30 | Austria | 26–29 | Norway | Gymnasium Fran Galović Sports Hall, Koprivnica; Attendance: 100; Referees: Aghakishi, Aghakishi (AZE) |
| 18 August 2021; 14:30 | Magelinskas 8 | (10–14) | Berg 7 | Gymnasium Fran Galović Sports Hall, Koprivnica; Attendance: 100; Referees: Aghakishi, Aghakishi (AZE) |
| 18 August 2021; 14:30 | 2× (yellow card) 7× (suspension) 1× (red card) | Report | 6× (suspension) | Gymnasium Fran Galović Sports Hall, Koprivnica; Attendance: 100; Referees: Aghakishi, Aghakishi (AZE) |

| 18 August 2021; 16:30 | France | 36–17 | Russia | Gymnasium Fran Galović Sports Hall, Koprivnica; Attendance: 50; Referees: Lončar, Lončar (CRO) |
| 18 August 2021; 16:30 | Pimenta 6 | (17–7) | Dobrynin 5 | Gymnasium Fran Galović Sports Hall, Koprivnica; Attendance: 50; Referees: Lončar, Lončar (CRO) |
| 18 August 2021; 16:30 | 5× (suspension) | Report | 1× (yellow card) 5× (suspension) | Gymnasium Fran Galović Sports Hall, Koprivnica; Attendance: 50; Referees: Lončar, Lončar (CRO) |

== Main round ==
=== Group I ===
| Pos | Team | Pld | W | D | L | GF | GA | GD | Pts | Qualification |
|---|---|---|---|---|---|---|---|---|---|---|
| 1 | Slovenia | 3 | 2 | 1 | 0 | 95 | 88 | +7 | 5 | Semifinals |
| 2 | Spain | 3 | 1 | 2 | 0 | 104 | 97 | +7 | 4 | Semifinals |
| 3 | Sweden | 3 | 1 | 1 | 1 | 93 | 94 | −1 | 3 | 5–8th place semifinals |
| 4 | Iceland | 3 | 0 | 0 | 3 | 74 | 87 | −13 | 0 | 5–8th place semifinals |

Source: EHF
Rules for classification: 1) points; 2) head-to-head points; 3) head-to-head goal difference; 4) head-to-head number of goals scored; 5) goal difference.

| 17 August 2021; 18:30 | Iceland | 27–29 | Sweden | Varaždin Arena, Varaždin; Attendance: 100; Referees: Kinnari, Skogberg (FIN) |
| 17 August 2021; 18:30 | Ástþórsson 9 | (12–14) | Sanderhem 6 | Varaždin Arena, Varaždin; Attendance: 100; Referees: Kinnari, Skogberg (FIN) |
| 17 August 2021; 18:30 | 3× (yellow card) 2× (suspension) | Report | 4× (suspension) | Varaždin Arena, Varaždin; Attendance: 100; Referees: Kinnari, Skogberg (FIN) |

| 17 August 2021; 20:30 | Slovenia | 37–37 | Spain | Varaždin Arena, Varaždin; Attendance: 97; Referees: Covalciuc, Covalciuc (MDA) |
| 17 August 2021; 20:30 | Janc 17 | (21–18) | Fernández 8 | Varaždin Arena, Varaždin; Attendance: 97; Referees: Covalciuc, Covalciuc (MDA) |
| 17 August 2021; 20:30 | 1× (yellow card) 10× (suspension) | Report | 2× (yellow card) 5× (suspension) | Varaždin Arena, Varaždin; Attendance: 97; Referees: Covalciuc, Covalciuc (MDA) |

| 18 August 2021; 18:30 | Sweden | 29–32 | Slovenia | Varaždin Arena, Varaždin; Attendance: 144; Referees: Konjičanin, Konjičanin (BIH) |
| 18 August 2021; 18:30 | Stenmalm 13 | (15–16) | Makuc 8 | Varaždin Arena, Varaždin; Attendance: 144; Referees: Konjičanin, Konjičanin (BIH) |
| 18 August 2021; 18:30 | 2× (suspension) | Report | 7× (suspension) 1× (red card) | Varaždin Arena, Varaždin; Attendance: 144; Referees: Konjičanin, Konjičanin (BIH) |

| 18 August 2021; 20:30 | Spain | 32–25 | Iceland | Varaždin Arena, Varaždin; Attendance: 100; Referees: Martins, Martins (POR) |
| 18 August 2021; 20:30 | Gurri 7 | (16–12) | Óskarsson 5 | Varaždin Arena, Varaždin; Attendance: 100; Referees: Martins, Martins (POR) |
| 18 August 2021; 20:30 | 1× (yellow card) 5× (suspension) | Report | 1× (yellow card) 7× (suspension) 1× (red card) | Varaždin Arena, Varaždin; Attendance: 100; Referees: Martins, Martins (POR) |

=== Group II ===
| Pos | Team | Pld | W | D | L | GF | GA | GD | Pts | Qualification |
|---|---|---|---|---|---|---|---|---|---|---|
| 1 | Germany | 3 | 2 | 1 | 0 | 89 | 82 | +7 | 5 | Semifinals |
| 2 | Croatia (H) | 3 | 2 | 0 | 1 | 85 | 82 | +3 | 4 | Semifinals |
| 3 | Portugal | 3 | 1 | 0 | 2 | 92 | 96 | −4 | 2 | 5–8th place semifinals |
| 4 | Denmark | 3 | 0 | 1 | 2 | 81 | 87 | −6 | 1 | 5–8th place semifinals |

Source: EHF
Rules for classification: 1) points; 2) head-to-head points; 3) head-to-head goal difference; 4) head-to-head number of goals scored; 5) goal difference.
(H) Hosts

| 17 August 2021; 18:30 | Germany | 34–30 | Portugal | Gymnasium Fran Galović Sports Hall, Koprivnica; Attendance: 100; Referees: Metalari, Nikolovski (MKD) |
| 17 August 2021; 18:30 | Freihöfer 10 | (18–15) | F. Costa 9 | Gymnasium Fran Galović Sports Hall, Koprivnica; Attendance: 100; Referees: Metalari, Nikolovski (MKD) |
| 17 August 2021; 18:30 | 1× (yellow card) 4× (suspension) | Report | 1× (yellow card) 6× (suspension) 1× (red card) | Gymnasium Fran Galović Sports Hall, Koprivnica; Attendance: 100; Referees: Metalari, Nikolovski (MKD) |

| 17 August 2021; 20:30 | Denmark | 25–27 | Croatia | Gymnasium Fran Galović Sports Hall, Koprivnica; Attendance: 300; Referees: Bolic, Hurich (AUT) |
| 17 August 2021; 20:30 | T. Arnoldsen 11 | (11–10) | Lisac 9 | Gymnasium Fran Galović Sports Hall, Koprivnica; Attendance: 300; Referees: Bolic, Hurich (AUT) |
| 17 August 2021; 20:30 | 1× (yellow card) 3× (suspension) 1× (red card) | Report | 1× (yellow card) 8× (suspension) | Gymnasium Fran Galović Sports Hall, Koprivnica; Attendance: 300; Referees: Bolic, Hurich (AUT) |

| 18 August 2021; 18:30 | Portugal | 31–27 | Denmark | Gymnasium Fran Galović Sports Hall, Koprivnica; Attendance: 100; Referees: Boričić, Marković (SRB) |
| 18 August 2021; 18:30 | Machado 8 | (17–12) | Boldsen 6 | Gymnasium Fran Galović Sports Hall, Koprivnica; Attendance: 100; Referees: Boričić, Marković (SRB) |
| 18 August 2021; 18:30 | 7× (suspension) | Report | 1× (yellow card) 4× (suspension) | Gymnasium Fran Galović Sports Hall, Koprivnica; Attendance: 100; Referees: Boričić, Marković (SRB) |

| 18 August 2021; 20:30 | Croatia | 23–26 | Germany | Gymnasium Fran Galović Sports Hall, Koprivnica; Attendance: 200; Referees: Kinnari, Skogberg (FIN) |
| 18 August 2021; 20:30 | Hršak 9 | (9–13) | Schöttle 6 | Gymnasium Fran Galović Sports Hall, Koprivnica; Attendance: 200; Referees: Kinnari, Skogberg (FIN) |
| 18 August 2021; 20:30 | 3× (yellow card) 6× (suspension) | Report | 4× (suspension) | Gymnasium Fran Galović Sports Hall, Koprivnica; Attendance: 200; Referees: Kinnari, Skogberg (FIN) |

== Final round ==
=== Bracket ===
Championship bracket

Semifinals
20 August
Slovenia | 22
Croatia | 26
20 August
Germany | 31
Spain | 30

Final
22 August
Croatia | 20
Germany | 34
Third place
22 August
Slovenia | 28
Spain | 37

Ninth place bracket

9–12th place semifinals
20 August
Hungary | 28
Norway | 21
20 August
France | 30
Italy | 23

Ninth place
21 August
Hungary | 35
France | 25
Eleventh place
21 August
Norway | 31
Italy | 24

Fifth place bracket

5–8th place semifinals
20 August
Sweden | 29
Denmark | 34
20 August
Portugal | 33
Iceland | 30

Fifth place
22 August
Denmark | 31
Portugal | 27
Seventh place
22 August
Sweden | 26
Iceland | 24

13th place bracket

13–16th place semifinals
20 August
Israel | 33
Russia | 31
20 August
Austria | 27
Serbia | 33

13th place
21 August
Israel | 25
Serbia | 27
15th place
21 August
Russia | 31
Austria | 24

=== 13–16th place semifinals ===
| 20 August 2021; 13:00 | Israel | 33–31 | Russia | Gymnasium Fran Galović Sports Hall, Koprivnica; Attendance: 50; Referees: Martins, Martins (POR) |
| 20 August 2021; 13:00 | Levi 12 | (14–18) | Kandybin 13 | Gymnasium Fran Galović Sports Hall, Koprivnica; Attendance: 50; Referees: Martins, Martins (POR) |
| 20 August 2021; 13:00 | 1× (yellow card) 3× (suspension) | Report | 1× (yellow card) 6× (suspension) | Gymnasium Fran Galović Sports Hall, Koprivnica; Attendance: 50; Referees: Martins, Martins (POR) |

| 20 August 2021; 15:15 | Austria | 27–33 | Serbia | Gymnasium Fran Galović Sports Hall, Koprivnica; Attendance: 50; Referees: Covalciuc, Covalciuc (MDA) |
| 20 August 2021; 15:15 | Pieber 8 | (11–18) | Zečević 9 | Gymnasium Fran Galović Sports Hall, Koprivnica; Attendance: 50; Referees: Covalciuc, Covalciuc (MDA) |
| 20 August 2021; 15:15 | 2× (yellow card) 4× (suspension) | Report | 2× (suspension) | Gymnasium Fran Galović Sports Hall, Koprivnica; Attendance: 50; Referees: Covalciuc, Covalciuc (MDA) |

=== 9–12th place semifinals ===
| 20 August 2021; 17:30 | Hungary | 28–21 | Norway | Gymnasium Fran Galović Sports Hall, Koprivnica; Attendance: 100; Referees: Lončar, Lončar (CRO) |
| 20 August 2021; 17:30 | Lukács 6 | (14–8) | Berg 5 | Gymnasium Fran Galović Sports Hall, Koprivnica; Attendance: 100; Referees: Lončar, Lončar (CRO) |
| 20 August 2021; 17:30 | 5× (suspension) 1× (red card) | Report | 4× (suspension) | Gymnasium Fran Galović Sports Hall, Koprivnica; Attendance: 100; Referees: Lončar, Lončar (CRO) |

| 20 August 2021; 19:45 | France | 30–22 | Italy | Gymnasium Fran Galović Sports Hall, Koprivnica; Attendance: 100; Referees: Stokes, Bartlett (GBR) |
| 20 August 2021; 19:45 | Vincent 9 | (18–13) | Fadanelli 9 | Gymnasium Fran Galović Sports Hall, Koprivnica; Attendance: 100; Referees: Stokes, Bartlett (GBR) |
| 20 August 2021; 19:45 | 4× (suspension) | Report | 4× (suspension) | Gymnasium Fran Galović Sports Hall, Koprivnica; Attendance: 100; Referees: Stokes, Bartlett (GBR) |

=== 5–8th place semifinals ===
| 20 August 2021; 13:00 | Sweden | 29–34 | Denmark | Varaždin Arena, Varaždin; Attendance: 100; Referees: Metalari, Nikolovski (MKD) |
| 20 August 2021; 13:00 | Möller 8 | (14–18) | Als 8 | Varaždin Arena, Varaždin; Attendance: 100; Referees: Metalari, Nikolovski (MKD) |
| 20 August 2021; 13:00 | 5× (suspension) | Report | 1× (yellow card) 7× (suspension) | Varaždin Arena, Varaždin; Attendance: 100; Referees: Metalari, Nikolovski (MKD) |

| 20 August 2021; 15:15 | Portugal | 33–30 | Iceland | Varaždin Arena, Varaždin; Attendance: 100; Referees: Kinnari, Skogberg (FIN) |
| 20 August 2021; 15:15 | F. Costa 10 | (17–13) | Guðjónsson 9 | Varaždin Arena, Varaždin; Attendance: 100; Referees: Kinnari, Skogberg (FIN) |
| 20 August 2021; 15:15 | 4× (suspension) | Report | 4× (suspension) | Varaždin Arena, Varaždin; Attendance: 100; Referees: Kinnari, Skogberg (FIN) |

=== Semifinals ===
| 20 August 2021; 17:30 | Germany | 31–30 | Spain | Varaždin Arena, Varaždin; Attendance: 200; Referees: Boričić, Marković (SRB) |
| 20 August 2021; 17:30 | Leitz 7 | (17–14) | Martínez 5 | Varaždin Arena, Varaždin; Attendance: 200; Referees: Boričić, Marković (SRB) |
| 20 August 2021; 17:30 | 1× (yellow card) 7× (suspension) | Report | 1× (yellow card) 5× (suspension) | Varaždin Arena, Varaždin; Attendance: 200; Referees: Boričić, Marković (SRB) |

| 20 August 2021; 20:00 | Slovenia | 22–26 | Croatia | Varaždin Arena, Varaždin; Attendance: 500; Referees: Bolic, Hurich (AUT) |
| 20 August 2021; 20:00 | Janc 9 | (9–10) | Jurišić 7 | Varaždin Arena, Varaždin; Attendance: 500; Referees: Bolic, Hurich (AUT) |
| 20 August 2021; 20:00 | 2× (yellow card) 5× (suspension) 1× (red card) | Report | 4× (suspension) | Varaždin Arena, Varaždin; Attendance: 500; Referees: Bolic, Hurich (AUT) |

=== 15th place game ===
| 21 August 2021; 12:00 | Russia | 31–24 | Austria | Gymnasium Fran Galović Sports Hall, Koprivnica; Attendance: 19; Referees: Aghakishi, Aghakishi (AZE) |
| 21 August 2021; 12:00 | Kandybin 11 | (11–13) | Magelinskas 10 | Gymnasium Fran Galović Sports Hall, Koprivnica; Attendance: 19; Referees: Aghakishi, Aghakishi (AZE) |
| 21 August 2021; 12:00 | 1× (yellow card) 4× (suspension) | Report | 4× (suspension) | Gymnasium Fran Galović Sports Hall, Koprivnica; Attendance: 19; Referees: Aghakishi, Aghakishi (AZE) |

=== 13th place game ===
| 21 August 2021; 14:15 | Israel | 25–27 | Serbia | Gymnasium Fran Galović Sports Hall, Koprivnica; Attendance: 30; Referees: Kinnari, Skogberg (FIN) |
| 21 August 2021; 14:15 | Levi 10 | (12–16) | S. Dodić 7 | Gymnasium Fran Galović Sports Hall, Koprivnica; Attendance: 30; Referees: Kinnari, Skogberg (FIN) |
| 21 August 2021; 14:15 | 1× (yellow card) 3× (suspension) | Report | 1× (yellow card) 4× (suspension) | Gymnasium Fran Galović Sports Hall, Koprivnica; Attendance: 30; Referees: Kinnari, Skogberg (FIN) |

=== Eleventh place game ===
| 21 August 2021; 16:30 | Norway | 31–24 | Italy | Gymnasium Fran Galović Sports Hall, Koprivnica; Attendance: 50; Referees: Konjičanin, Konjičanin (BIH) |
| 21 August 2021; 16:30 | Høiness 6 | (16–8) | Fadanelli 5 | Gymnasium Fran Galović Sports Hall, Koprivnica; Attendance: 50; Referees: Konjičanin, Konjičanin (BIH) |
| 21 August 2021; 16:30 | 6× (suspension) | Report | 2× (suspension) | Gymnasium Fran Galović Sports Hall, Koprivnica; Attendance: 50; Referees: Konjičanin, Konjičanin (BIH) |

=== Ninth place game ===
| 21 August 2021; 18:45 | Hungary | 35–25 | France | Gymnasium Fran Galović Sports Hall, Koprivnica; Attendance: 100; Referees: Metalari, Nikolovski (MKD) |
| 21 August 2021; 18:45 | Fazekas 8 | (17–13) | Fadhuile-Crépy, Vincent 5 | Gymnasium Fran Galović Sports Hall, Koprivnica; Attendance: 100; Referees: Metalari, Nikolovski (MKD) |
| 21 August 2021; 18:45 | 4× (suspension) | Report | 2× (suspension) | Gymnasium Fran Galović Sports Hall, Koprivnica; Attendance: 100; Referees: Metalari, Nikolovski (MKD) |

=== Seventh place game ===
| 22 August 2021; 10:00 | Sweden | 26–24 | Iceland | Varaždin Arena, Varaždin; Attendance: 150; Referees: Boričić, Marković (SRB) |
| 22 August 2021; 10:00 | Larsson 8 | (11–11) | Óskarsson 7 | Varaždin Arena, Varaždin; Attendance: 150; Referees: Boričić, Marković (SRB) |
| 22 August 2021; 10:00 | 2× (yellow card) 4× (suspension) | Report | 1× (yellow card) 5× (suspension) | Varaždin Arena, Varaždin; Attendance: 150; Referees: Boričić, Marković (SRB) |

=== Fifth place game ===
| 22 August 2021; 12:15 | Denmark | 31–27 | Portugal | Varaždin Arena, Varaždin; Attendance: 100; Referees: Covalciuc, Covalciuc (MDA) |
| 22 August 2021; 12:15 | Boldsen 9 | (14–12) | Sousa 5 | Varaždin Arena, Varaždin; Attendance: 100; Referees: Covalciuc, Covalciuc (MDA) |
| 22 August 2021; 12:15 | 1× (yellow card) | Report | 4× (suspension) | Varaždin Arena, Varaždin; Attendance: 100; Referees: Covalciuc, Covalciuc (MDA) |

=== Third place game ===
| 22 August 2021; 14:30 | Slovenia | 28–37 | Spain | Varaždin Arena, Varaždin; Attendance: 500; Referees: Konjičanin, Konjičanin (BIH) |
| 22 August 2021; 14:30 | Miklavec 7 | (13–17) | Fernández 11 | Varaždin Arena, Varaždin; Attendance: 500; Referees: Konjičanin, Konjičanin (BIH) |
| 22 August 2021; 14:30 | 8× (suspension) 1× (red card) | Report | 4× (suspension) | Varaždin Arena, Varaždin; Attendance: 500; Referees: Konjičanin, Konjičanin (BIH) |

=== Final ===
| 22 August 2021; 17:00 | Croatia | 20–34 | Germany | Varaždin Arena, Varaždin; Attendance: 1,500; Referees: Martins, Martins (POR) |
| 22 August 2021; 17:00 | Jurišić 4 | (14–19) | Freihöfer, Uščins 6 | Varaždin Arena, Varaždin; Attendance: 1,500; Referees: Martins, Martins (POR) |
| 22 August 2021; 17:00 | 1× (yellow card) 3× (suspension) | Report | 5× (suspension) | Varaždin Arena, Varaždin; Attendance: 1,500; Referees: Martins, Martins (POR) |

== Final ranking ==
| Rank | Team |
|---|---|
| 1st place, gold medalist(s) | Germany |
| 2nd place, silver medalist(s) | Croatia |
| 3rd place, bronze medalist(s) | Spain |
| 4 | Slovenia |
| 5 | Denmark |
| 6 | Portugal |
| 7 | Sweden |
| 8 | Iceland |
| 9 | Hungary |
| 10 | France |
| 11 | Norway |
| 12 | Italy |
| 13 | Serbia |
| 14 | Israel |
| 15 | Russia |
| 16 | Austria |

| Relegated to the Men’s 18 EHF Championship 2022 |

== Tournament awards ==
The all-star team and awards were announced on 22 August 2021.

=== All-star team ===
| Position | Player |
|---|---|
| Goalkeeper | (Germany) David Späth |
| Right wing | (Portugal) Francisco Costa |
| Right back | (Germany) Renars Uščins |
| Centre back | (Slovenia) Mitja Janc |
| Left back | (Sweden) Elliot Stenmalm |
| Left wing | (Croatia) Ivan Barbić |
| Pivot | (Spain) Javier Rodríguez |

=== Awards ===
| Most valuable player | (Slovenia) Mitja Janc |
| Best defender | (Croatia) Mislav Obradović |
| Top scorer | (Slovenia) Mitja Janc (Sweden) Elliot Stenmalm |
