= 2026 European Men's U-18 Handball Championship =

15th edition of the European Men's U-18 Handball Championship

Tournament details
- Host country: Serbia
- City: Belgrade
- Venues: 3 (in 1 host city)
- Dates: 29 July – 9 August
- Teams: 24 (from 1 confederation)

Final positions
- Champions: Germany (4th title)
- Runners-up: Slovenia
- Third place: Denmark

Tournament statistics
- Matches played: 96
- Top scorer: (Israel) Yonathan Pelach (97 goals)

Awards
- Best player: (Slovenia) Jaka Podvrsic

The 2026 European Men's U-18 Handball Championship, commonly referred to as the M18 EHF Euro 2026, was the 15th edition of the EHF European Men's U-18 Handball Championship, the biennial international under-18 men's handball championship of Europe organized by EHF. It was hosted by Serbia from 29 July to 9 August 2026, marking the first time the event was held in the country. The tournament was played in Belgrade.

24 teams participated for the second time, following the expansion in 2024. This tournament also served as a qualifier for the 2027 IHF Men's U19 Handball World Championship in an unknown country.

Sweden are the defending champions, having beaten Denmark in the 2024 final in Podgorica.

== Bidding process ==
- Montenegro
- North Macedonia
- Serbia
- Slovenia

On 13 December 2024, at a meeting in Vienna, the hosting rights were awarded to Serbia. This will be the first time Serbia hosts the tournament, although it previously organised the 2004 edition as Serbia and Montenegro.

=== Quotes ===
This is a great victory for our Federation, we are not even aware of how big a thing it is to win the hosting of the European Championship. The organization of this competition will bring a lot of good to Serbia, Belgrade and our handball because we will host as many as 24 countries. Our country has not had this privilege since 2013, when it won its last medal in a major competition. Incredibly, twenty years have passed since the organization of the Cadet European Championship when our country won the gold medal. A year later, we were also world champions. May such success be repeated. I must also point out that this is the only way to bring our handball back to the world map and to get children to come to our sport. We have a lot of hard work ahead of us, but we are ready to push all the boundaries when it comes to organization. We owe a great debt of gratitude to all members of the EHF Executive Board, as well as to the Competition Committee headed by Božidar Đurković

— Ivan Milivojević, president of the Serbian Handball Federation.

== Format ==
The tournament consisted of three phases: The first two were played in a round-robin-groups format. The third phase was played in a playoff format with consolations.

In the First phase, 24 teams were drawn into six groups of four.

- The top two teams from each group advanced to the Main round.
- The third- and fourth-placed teams advanced to the Intermediate round.

In the Second phase, all teams were again divided into groups of four, but this time, against the teams that advanced to the same round as them. Each separate round (Main and Intermediate) was played by 12 teams, divided into three groups of four.

- In the Main round, the top two teams from each group and the best two third-placed teams advanced to the quarterfinals. The other four teams advanced to the 9th–16th place playoffs.
- In the Intermediate round, the winners of each group and the best second-placed team advanced to the 9th–16th place playoffs. The other eight teams advanced to the 17th–24th place playoffs.

In the Third phase, the teams were divided into three playoff tiers of eight teams each, with each team playing three more matches there. Each of the three playoffs consisted of four quarterfinals, two semifinals, two consolation semifinals, and four final placement matches.

The format changed from the previous edition. This new format was previously adopted in the 2025 women's under age European Championships.

== Qualification ==
Competition	Dates	Host	Vacancies	Qualified
Host nation	13 December 2024	(Austria) Vienna	1	Serbia
Men's 18 EHF EURO 2024	7–18 August 2024	Montenegro	12	Sweden; Denmark; Hungary; Iceland; Germany; Serbia; Norway; Spain; Slovenia; Portugal; France; Croatia; Faroe Islands; Austria
Qualifiers	31 October – 2 November 2025	(Turkey) Çankaya	2	Italy; Turkey
Qualifiers	31 October – 2 November 2025	(Switzerland) Schaffhausen	2	Switzerland; Poland
Qualifiers	31 October – 2 November 2025	(Slovakia) Šaľa	2	Slovakia; Montenegro
Qualifiers	31 October – 2 November 2025	Luxembourg City	2	North Macedonia; Finland
Qualifiers	31 October – 2 November 2025	(Lithuania) Klaipėda	2	Czech Republic; Israel

== Venues ==
All three venues are located in Belgrade.

Sportski Centar "Voždovac"; Capacity: 4,738	CCS Šumice; Capacity: 2,000	Aleksandar Nikolić Hall; Capacity: 8,000

== Draw ==
The draw was held on 24 February 2026 in Vienna.

Pot 1	Pot 2	Pot 3	Pot 4
Denmark; Spain; Germany; Hungary; Portugal; Sweden	Croatia; Faroe Islands; Iceland; Norway; Slovenia; Serbia	Austria; Czech Republic; France; Italy; Switzerland; Slovakia	Finland; Israel; North Macedonia; Montenegro; Poland; Turkey

== Preliminary round ==
=== Tiebreakers ===
In the group stages (preliminary and main rounds), teams are ranked according to points (2 points for a win, 1 point for a draw, 0 points for a loss). If two or more teams have the same number of points, the ranking will be determined as follows:

During the round matches

1. Superior goal difference from all group matches;
2. Higher number of goals scored in all group matches;
3. Alphabetical order.

After completion of the round matches

1. Highest number of points in matches between the teams directly involved;
2. Superior goal difference in matches between the teams directly involved;
3. Highest number of goals scored in matches between the teams directly involved;
4. Superior goal difference in all matches of the group;
5. Highest number of plus goals in all matches of the group;

If the ranking of one of these teams is determined, the above criteria are consecutively followed until the ranking of all teams is determined. If no ranking can be determined, a decision shall be obtained by EHF through drawing of lots.

=== Group A ===
Pos	Team	Pld	W	D	L	GF	GA	GD	Pts	Qualification
1	Slovenia	3	3	0	0	110	93	+17	6	Main round
2	France	3	2	0	1	97	85	+12	4	Main round
3	Sweden	3	1	0	2	92	103	−11	2	Intermediate round
4	North Macedonia	3	0	0	3	84	102	−18	0	Intermediate round

Source: EHF
Rules for classification: 1) points; 2) head-to-head points; 3) head-to-head goal difference; 4) head-to-head number of goals scored; 5) Goal difference.

29 July 2026; 12:00	Slovenia	33–30	North Macedonia	Sportski Centar "Voždovac", Belgrade; Attendance: 300; Referees: Braganca, Xavier (POR)
29 July 2026; 12:00	Podvrsic 8	(12–18)	Kostov, Vuchevski 6	Sportski Centar "Voždovac", Belgrade; Attendance: 300; Referees: Braganca, Xavier (POR)
29 July 2026; 12:00	2× (suspension)	Report	2× (suspension)	Sportski Centar "Voždovac", Belgrade; Attendance: 300; Referees: Braganca, Xavier (POR)

29 July 2026; 17:00	Sweden	26–31	France	Sportski Centar "Voždovac", Belgrade; Attendance: 100; Referees: Cipov, Klus (SVK)
29 July 2026; 17:00	Carlsson 12	(11–13)	Saillard 9	Sportski Centar "Voždovac", Belgrade; Attendance: 100; Referees: Cipov, Klus (SVK)
29 July 2026; 17:00	4× (suspension) 1× (red card)	Report	5× (suspension)	Sportski Centar "Voždovac", Belgrade; Attendance: 100; Referees: Cipov, Klus (SVK)

30 July 2026; 12:00	France	36–25	North Macedonia	Sportski Centar "Voždovac", Belgrade; Attendance: 120; Referees: Klompers, Stobbe (NED)
30 July 2026; 12:00	Boisnee-Noc 7	(20–13)	Popovski 6	Sportski Centar "Voždovac", Belgrade; Attendance: 120; Referees: Klompers, Stobbe (NED)
30 July 2026; 12:00	1× (suspension)	Report	2× (yellow card) 1× (suspension)	Sportski Centar "Voždovac", Belgrade; Attendance: 120; Referees: Klompers, Stobbe (NED)

30 July 2026; 17:00	Sweden	33–43	Slovenia	Sportski Centar "Voždovac", Belgrade; Attendance: 250; Referees: Y. El-Saied, H. El-Saied (EGY)
30 July 2026; 17:00	Källemyr 13	(20–24)	Podvrsic 14	Sportski Centar "Voždovac", Belgrade; Attendance: 250; Referees: Y. El-Saied, H. El-Saied (EGY)
30 July 2026; 17:00	7× (suspension)	Report	2× (suspension)	Sportski Centar "Voždovac", Belgrade; Attendance: 250; Referees: Y. El-Saied, H. El-Saied (EGY)

1 August 2026; 12:00	North Macedonia	29–33	Sweden	CCS Šumice, Belgrade; Attendance: 150; Referees: Bartkowiak, Lakomy (POL)
1 August 2026; 12:00	Kostov, Damchevski 8	(16–18)	Carson, Pasthuovic 6	CCS Šumice, Belgrade; Attendance: 150; Referees: Bartkowiak, Lakomy (POL)
1 August 2026; 12:00	1× (yellow card) 2× (suspension)	Report	5× (suspension)	CCS Šumice, Belgrade; Attendance: 150; Referees: Bartkowiak, Lakomy (POL)

1 August 2026; 17:00	Slovenia	34–30	France	CCS Šumice, Belgrade; Attendance: 200; Referees: L. Hardegger, S. Hardegger (SUI)
1 August 2026; 17:00	Podvrsic 9	(15–14)	Saillard 8	CCS Šumice, Belgrade; Attendance: 200; Referees: L. Hardegger, S. Hardegger (SUI)
1 August 2026; 17:00	1× (yellow card) 3× (suspension)	Report	2× (suspension)	CCS Šumice, Belgrade; Attendance: 200; Referees: L. Hardegger, S. Hardegger (SUI)

=== Group B ===
Pos	Team	Pld	W	D	L	GF	GA	GD	Pts	Qualification
1	Germany	3	2	1	0	120	76	+44	5	Main round
2	Serbia	3	2	1	0	93	70	+23	5	Main round
3	Italy	3	1	0	2	85	103	−18	2	Intermediate round
4	Turkey	3	0	0	3	71	120	−49	0	Intermediate round

Source: EHF
Rules for classification: 1) points; 2) head-to-head points; 3) head-to-head goal difference; 4) head-to-head number of goals scored; 5) Goal difference.

29 July 2026; 14:30	Germany	48–26	Italy	Sportski Centar "Voždovac", Belgrade; Attendance: 100; Referees: Grapsas, Kyriakou (GRE)
29 July 2026; 14:30	Elze 9	(25–13)	three players 4	Sportski Centar "Voždovac", Belgrade; Attendance: 100; Referees: Grapsas, Kyriakou (GRE)
29 July 2026; 14:30	7× (suspension)	Report	2× (suspension)	Sportski Centar "Voždovac", Belgrade; Attendance: 100; Referees: Grapsas, Kyriakou (GRE)

29 July 2026; 19:45	Serbia	34–25	Turkey	Sportski Centar "Voždovac", Belgrade, Belgrade; Attendance: 905; Referees: L. Hardegger, S. Hardegger (SUI)
29 July 2026; 19:45	Pavolvic 7	(15–7)	Tan 6	Sportski Centar "Voždovac", Belgrade, Belgrade; Attendance: 905; Referees: L. Hardegger, S. Hardegger (SUI)
29 July 2026; 19:45	1× (yellow card) 3× (suspension)	Report	6× (suspension)	Sportski Centar "Voždovac", Belgrade, Belgrade; Attendance: 905; Referees: L. Hardegger, S. Hardegger (SUI)

30 July 2026; 14:30	Italy	41–23	Turkey	Sportski Centar "Voždovac", Belgrade; Attendance: 100; Referees: Ivanovic, Kaludjerovic (MNE)
30 July 2026; 14:30	Belardinelli 7	(20–10)	Akçam 6	Sportski Centar "Voždovac", Belgrade; Attendance: 100; Referees: Ivanovic, Kaludjerovic (MNE)
30 July 2026; 14:30	1× (yellow card) 4× (suspension)	Report	1× (yellow card) 4× (suspension)	Sportski Centar "Voždovac", Belgrade; Attendance: 100; Referees: Ivanovic, Kaludjerovic (MNE)

30 July 2026; 19:30	Germany	27–27	Serbia	Sportski Centar "Voždovac", Belgrade; Attendance: 1500; Referees: Cipov, Klus (SVK)
30 July 2026; 19:30	three players 5	(14–14)	Blecic 9	Sportski Centar "Voždovac", Belgrade; Attendance: 1500; Referees: Cipov, Klus (SVK)
30 July 2026; 19:30	2× (yellow card) 7× (suspension)	Report	1× (yellow card) 4× (suspension)	Sportski Centar "Voždovac", Belgrade; Attendance: 1500; Referees: Cipov, Klus (SVK)

1 August 2026; 14:30	Turkey	23–45	Germany	CCS Šumice, Belgrade; Attendance: 150; Referees: H. El-Saied, Y. El-Saied (EGY)
1 August 2026; 14:30	Tan 5	(10–22)	Faciejew	CCS Šumice, Belgrade; Attendance: 150; Referees: H. El-Saied, Y. El-Saied (EGY)
1 August 2026; 14:30		Report	3× (suspension)	CCS Šumice, Belgrade; Attendance: 150; Referees: H. El-Saied, Y. El-Saied (EGY)

1 August 2026; 19:30	Serbia	32–18	Italy	CCS Šumice, Belgrade; Attendance: 1300; Referees: Braganca, Xavier (POR)
1 August 2026; 19:30	three players 7	(11–12)	Agrillo 5	CCS Šumice, Belgrade; Attendance: 1300; Referees: Braganca, Xavier (POR)
1 August 2026; 19:30	1× (suspension)	Report	2× (suspension)	CCS Šumice, Belgrade; Attendance: 1300; Referees: Braganca, Xavier (POR)

=== Group C ===
Pos	Team	Pld	W	D	L	GF	GA	GD	Pts	Qualification
1	Croatia	3	2	0	1	88	86	+2	4	Main round
2	Portugal	3	2	0	1	81	73	+8	4	Main round
3	Czech Republic	3	1	1	1	88	86	+2	3	Intermediate round
4	Israel	3	0	1	2	81	93	−12	1	Intermediate round

Source: EHF
Rules for classification: 1) points; 2) head-to-head points; 3) head-to-head goal difference; 4) head-to-head number of goals scored; 5) Goal difference.

29 July 2026; 12:00	Croatia	33–29	Israel	Aleksandar Nikolić Hall, Belgrade; Attendance: 120; Referees: Janz, Sug (GER)
29 July 2026; 12:00	Bajan 11	(15–17)	Pelach 14	Aleksandar Nikolić Hall, Belgrade; Attendance: 120; Referees: Janz, Sug (GER)
29 July 2026; 12:00	5× (suspension)	Report	7× (suspension)	Aleksandar Nikolić Hall, Belgrade; Attendance: 120; Referees: Janz, Sug (GER)

29 July 2026; 17:00	Portugal	27–25	Czech Republic	Aleksandar Nikolić Hall, Belgrade; Attendance: 150; Referees: Bartkowiak, Lakomy (POL)
29 July 2026; 17:00	Sousa Marques 10	(11–14)	Štochl 4	Aleksandar Nikolić Hall, Belgrade; Attendance: 150; Referees: Bartkowiak, Lakomy (POL)
29 July 2026; 17:00	1× (yellow card) 2× (suspension)	Report	1× (suspension)	Aleksandar Nikolić Hall, Belgrade; Attendance: 150; Referees: Bartkowiak, Lakomy (POL)

30 July 2026; 12:00	Czech Republic	30–30	Israel	Aleksandar Nikolić Hall, Belgrade; Attendance: 70; Referees: Panetta, Riello (ITA)
30 July 2026; 12:00	Štochl 7	(17–18)	Geva, Nevo 7	Aleksandar Nikolić Hall, Belgrade; Attendance: 70; Referees: Panetta, Riello (ITA)
30 July 2026; 12:00	4× (suspension)	Report	1× (yellow card) 7× (suspension)	Aleksandar Nikolić Hall, Belgrade; Attendance: 70; Referees: Panetta, Riello (ITA)

30 July 2026; 17:00	Portugal	24–26	Croatia	Aleksandar Nikolić Hall, Belgrade; Attendance: 70; Referees: Grapsas, Kyriakou (GRE)
30 July 2026; 17:00	Andrade Fernandes 7	(14–15)	Pitt 10	Aleksandar Nikolić Hall, Belgrade; Attendance: 70; Referees: Grapsas, Kyriakou (GRE)
30 July 2026; 17:00	7× (suspension)	Report	1× (yellow card) 4× (suspension) 1× (red card)	Aleksandar Nikolić Hall, Belgrade; Attendance: 70; Referees: Grapsas, Kyriakou (GRE)

1 August 2026; 12:00	Israel	22–30	Portugal	Sportski Centar "Voždovac", Belgrade; Attendance: 100; Referees: Klompers, Stobbe (NED)
1 August 2026; 12:00	Pelach 8	(15–15)	Fernandes Conceição 6	Sportski Centar "Voždovac", Belgrade; Attendance: 100; Referees: Klompers, Stobbe (NED)
1 August 2026; 12:00	1× (yellow card) 4× (suspension)	Report	5× (suspension)	Sportski Centar "Voždovac", Belgrade; Attendance: 100; Referees: Klompers, Stobbe (NED)

1 August 2026; 17:00	Croatia	29–33	Czech Republic	Sportski Centar "Voždovac", Belgrade; Attendance: 100; Referees: Hummelgard, Svensson (SWE)
1 August 2026; 17:00	Rogic 8	(12–18)	Bartunek 7	Sportski Centar "Voždovac", Belgrade; Attendance: 100; Referees: Hummelgard, Svensson (SWE)
1 August 2026; 17:00	1× (yellow card) 2× (suspension)	Report	1× (yellow card) 3× (suspension)	Sportski Centar "Voždovac", Belgrade; Attendance: 100; Referees: Hummelgard, Svensson (SWE)

=== Group D ===
Pos	Team	Pld	W	D	L	GF	GA	GD	Pts	Qualification
1	Iceland	3	3	0	0	113	81	+32	6	Main round
2	Hungary	3	2	0	1	94	95	−1	4	Main round
3	Switzerland	3	1	0	2	94	94	0	2	Intermediate round
4	Montenegro	3	0	0	3	77	108	−31	0	Intermediate round

Source: EHF
Rules for classification: 1) points; 2) head-to-head points; 3) head-to-head goal difference; 4) head-to-head number of goals scored; 5) Goal difference.

29 July 2026; 14:30	Iceland	39–25	Montenegro	Aleksandar Nikolić Hall, Belgrade; Attendance: 80; Referees: Panetta, Riello (ITA)
29 July 2026; 14:30	Aronsson 10	(19–20)	Gutic	Aleksandar Nikolić Hall, Belgrade; Attendance: 80; Referees: Panetta, Riello (ITA)
29 July 2026; 14:30	5× (suspension)	Report	1× (yellow card) 3× (suspension) 1× (red card)	Aleksandar Nikolić Hall, Belgrade; Attendance: 80; Referees: Panetta, Riello (ITA)

29 July 2026; 19:30	Hungary	33–30	Switzerland	Aleksandar Nikolić Hall, Belgrade; Attendance: 80; Referees: H. El-Saied, Y El-Saied (EGY)
29 July 2026; 19:30	Iváncisk 11	(16–14)	Thomann 9	Aleksandar Nikolić Hall, Belgrade; Attendance: 80; Referees: H. El-Saied, Y El-Saied (EGY)
29 July 2026; 19:30	5× (suspension)	Report	1× (suspension)	Aleksandar Nikolić Hall, Belgrade; Attendance: 80; Referees: H. El-Saied, Y El-Saied (EGY)

30 July 2026; 14:30	Switzerland	36–28	Montenegro	Aleksandar Nikolić Hall, Belgrade; Attendance: 80; Referees: Hummelgard, Svensson (SWE)
30 July 2026; 14:30	Zimmermann 8	(18–10)	Gutic 12	Aleksandar Nikolić Hall, Belgrade; Attendance: 80; Referees: Hummelgard, Svensson (SWE)
30 July 2026; 14:30	3× (suspension)	Report	4× (suspension) 1× (red card)	Aleksandar Nikolić Hall, Belgrade; Attendance: 80; Referees: Hummelgard, Svensson (SWE)

30 July 2026; 19:30	Hungary	28–41	Iceland	Aleksandar Nikolić Hall, Belgrade; Attendance: 80; Referees: Janz, Sug (GER)
30 July 2026; 19:30	Ambrus 7	(13–20)	Róbertsson 12	Aleksandar Nikolić Hall, Belgrade; Attendance: 80; Referees: Janz, Sug (GER)
30 July 2026; 19:30	3× (suspension)	Report	1× (yellow card) 2× (suspension)	Aleksandar Nikolić Hall, Belgrade; Attendance: 80; Referees: Janz, Sug (GER)

1 August 2026; 14:30	Iceland	33–28	Switzerland	Sportski Centar "Voždovac", Belgrade; Attendance: 150; Referees: Cipov, Klus (SVK)
1 August 2026; 14:30	Hallgrímsson, Robertssón 7	(17–13)	three players 5	Sportski Centar "Voždovac", Belgrade; Attendance: 150; Referees: Cipov, Klus (SVK)
1 August 2026; 14:30	2× (suspension)	Report	4× (suspension)	Sportski Centar "Voždovac", Belgrade; Attendance: 150; Referees: Cipov, Klus (SVK)

1 August 2026; 19:30	Montenegro	24–33	Hungary	Sportski Centar "Voždovac", Belgrade; Attendance: 150; Referees: Grapsas, Kyriakou (GRE)
1 August 2026; 19:30	Gutic 7	(12–21)	Amburs 9	Sportski Centar "Voždovac", Belgrade; Attendance: 150; Referees: Grapsas, Kyriakou (GRE)
1 August 2026; 19:30	1× (suspension)	Report	3× (suspension)	Sportski Centar "Voždovac", Belgrade; Attendance: 150; Referees: Grapsas, Kyriakou (GRE)

=== Group E ===
Pos	Team	Pld	W	D	L	GF	GA	GD	Pts	Qualification
1	Denmark	3	3	0	0	112	70	+42	6	Main round
2	Poland	3	2	0	1	93	94	−1	4	Main round
3	Norway	3	1	0	2	83	105	−22	2	Intermediate round
4	Slovakia	3	0	0	3	86	105	−19	0	Intermediate round

Source: EHF
Rules for classification: 1) points; 2) head-to-head points; 3) head-to-head goal difference; 4) head-to-head number of goals scored; 5) Goal difference.

29 July 2026; 12:00	Norway	26–32	Poland	CCS Šumice, Belgrade; Attendance: 120; Referees: Petrovic, Zrnik (SRB)
29 July 2026; 12:00	three players 4	(12–15)	Thcazyk 6	CCS Šumice, Belgrade; Attendance: 120; Referees: Petrovic, Zrnik (SRB)
29 July 2026; 12:00	4× (suspension)	Report	5× (suspension)	CCS Šumice, Belgrade; Attendance: 120; Referees: Petrovic, Zrnik (SRB)

29 July 2026; 17:00	Denmark	35–22	Slovakia	CCS Šumice, Belgrade; Attendance: 200; Referees: Enache, Radut (ROM)
29 July 2026; 17:00	Knudsen 8	(15–10)	Valent	CCS Šumice, Belgrade; Attendance: 200; Referees: Enache, Radut (ROM)
29 July 2026; 17:00	5× (suspension)	Report	1× (yellow card) 8× (suspension)	CCS Šumice, Belgrade; Attendance: 200; Referees: Enache, Radut (ROM)

30 July 2026; 12:00	Slovakia	33–38	Poland	CCS Šumice, Belgrade; Attendance: 120; Referees: Danilovic, Karan (BIH)
30 July 2026; 12:00	Valent 13	(19–19)	Kruszelnicki 9	CCS Šumice, Belgrade; Attendance: 120; Referees: Danilovic, Karan (BIH)
30 July 2026; 12:00	3× (suspension)	Report	5× (suspension)	CCS Šumice, Belgrade; Attendance: 120; Referees: Danilovic, Karan (BIH)

30 July 2026; 17:00	Denmark	42–25	Norway	CCS Šumice, Belgrade; Attendance: 250; Referees: Braganca, Xavier (POR)
30 July 2026; 17:00	Asamoah-Larsen 10	(21–13)	Lund 7	CCS Šumice, Belgrade; Attendance: 250; Referees: Braganca, Xavier (POR)
30 July 2026; 17:00	6× (suspension)	Report	3× (suspension)	CCS Šumice, Belgrade; Attendance: 250; Referees: Braganca, Xavier (POR)

1 August 2026; 12:00	Poland	23–35	Denmark	Aleksandar Nikolić Hall, Belgrade; Attendance: 70; Referees: Janz, Sug (GER)
1 August 2026; 12:00	Skiba, Pruszkowski 4	(11–17)	Kvistgaard 9	Aleksandar Nikolić Hall, Belgrade; Attendance: 70; Referees: Janz, Sug (GER)
1 August 2026; 12:00	6× (suspension) 1× (red card)	Report	3× (suspension)	Aleksandar Nikolić Hall, Belgrade; Attendance: 70; Referees: Janz, Sug (GER)

1 August 2026; 17:00	Norway	32–31	Slovakia	Aleksandar Nikolić Hall, Belgrade; Attendance: 200; Referees: Ivanovic, Kaludjerovic (MNE)
1 August 2026; 17:00	Schildmann 6	(16–15)	Valent 10	Aleksandar Nikolić Hall, Belgrade; Attendance: 200; Referees: Ivanovic, Kaludjerovic (MNE)
1 August 2026; 17:00	2× (yellow card) 5× (suspension)	Report	8× (suspension) 1× (red card)	Aleksandar Nikolić Hall, Belgrade; Attendance: 200; Referees: Ivanovic, Kaludjerovic (MNE)

=== Group F ===
Pos	Team	Pld	W	D	L	GF	GA	GD	Pts	Qualification
1	Spain	3	3	0	0	103	72	+31	6	Main round
2	Faroe Islands	3	1	1	1	96	94	+2	3	Main round
3	Finland	3	1	0	2	73	99	−26	2	Intermediate round
4	Austria	3	0	1	2	69	76	−7	1	Intermediate round

Source: EHF
Rules for classification: 1) points; 2) head-to-head points; 3) head-to-head goal difference; 4) head-to-head number of goals scored; 5) Goal difference.

29 July 2026; 14:30	Faroe Islands	38–31	Finland	CCS Šumice, Belgrade; Attendance: 120; Referees: Hummelgard, Svensson (SWE)
29 July 2026; 14:30	á Skipagøtu 13	(17–16)	Ahlbäck 6	CCS Šumice, Belgrade; Attendance: 120; Referees: Hummelgard, Svensson (SWE)
29 July 2026; 14:30	4× (suspension)	Report	3× (suspension)	CCS Šumice, Belgrade; Attendance: 120; Referees: Hummelgard, Svensson (SWE)

29 July 2026; 19:30	Spain	25–23	Austria	CCS Šumice, Belgrade; Attendance: 250; Referees: Ivanovic, Kaludjerovic (MNE)
29 July 2026; 19:30	Carballar Foixench 6	(12–12)	Pajer 8	CCS Šumice, Belgrade; Attendance: 250; Referees: Ivanovic, Kaludjerovic (MNE)
29 July 2026; 19:30	4× (suspension)	Report	1× (yellow card) 3× (suspension) 1× (red card)	CCS Šumice, Belgrade; Attendance: 250; Referees: Ivanovic, Kaludjerovic (MNE)

30 July 2026; 14:30	Austria	20–25	Finland	CCS Šumice, Belgrade; Attendance: 300; Referees: Petrovic, Zrnic (SRB)
30 July 2026; 14:30	Stradinger 4	(8–10)	Hagman 7	CCS Šumice, Belgrade; Attendance: 300; Referees: Petrovic, Zrnic (SRB)
30 July 2026; 14:30	1× (yellow card) 3× (suspension)	Report	1× (yellow card) 3× (suspension)	CCS Šumice, Belgrade; Attendance: 300; Referees: Petrovic, Zrnic (SRB)

30 July 2026; 19:30	Spain	37–32	Faroe Islands	CCS Šumice, Belgrade; Attendance: 80; Referees: L. Hardegger, S. Hardegger (SUI)
30 July 2026; 19:30	Sola Basterra 10	(16–15)	á Skipagøtu 14	CCS Šumice, Belgrade; Attendance: 80; Referees: L. Hardegger, S. Hardegger (SUI)
30 July 2026; 19:30	3× (suspension)	Report	1× (yellow card) 5× (suspension)	CCS Šumice, Belgrade; Attendance: 80; Referees: L. Hardegger, S. Hardegger (SUI)

1 August 2026; 14:30	Finland	17–41	Spain	Aleksandar Nikolić Hall, Belgrade; Attendance: 80; Referees: Danilovic, Karan (BIH)
1 August 2026; 14:30	Hagman 4	(11–19)	Sola Basterra 7	Aleksandar Nikolić Hall, Belgrade; Attendance: 80; Referees: Danilovic, Karan (BIH)
1 August 2026; 14:30	1× (suspension)	Report	3× (suspension)	Aleksandar Nikolić Hall, Belgrade; Attendance: 80; Referees: Danilovic, Karan (BIH)

1 August 2026; 19:30	Faroe Islands	26–26	Austria	Aleksandar Nikolić Hall, Belgrade; Attendance: 120; Referees: Panetta, Riello (ITA)
1 August 2026; 19:30	á Skipagøtu, Bogason 5	(12–13)	Kopeingg, Kelih 6	Aleksandar Nikolić Hall, Belgrade; Attendance: 120; Referees: Panetta, Riello (ITA)
1 August 2026; 19:30	1× (suspension)	Report	3× (suspension)	Aleksandar Nikolić Hall, Belgrade; Attendance: 120; Referees: Panetta, Riello (ITA)

== Intermediate round ==
=== Group I ===
Pos	Team	Pld	W	D	L	GF	GA	GD	Pts	Qualification
1	Sweden	3	3	0	0	105	87	+18	6	9th–16th place playoffs
2	North Macedonia	3	2	0	1	91	83	+8	4	9th–16th place playoffs
3	Italy	3	1	0	2	90	87	+3	2	17th–24th place playoffs
4	Turkey	3	0	0	3	82	111	−29	0	17th–24th place playoffs

Source: EHF
Rules for classification: 1) points; 2) head-to-head points; 3) head-to-head goal difference; 4) head-to-head number of goals scored; 5) Goal difference.

3 August 2026; 12:00	Sweden	41–32	Turkey	Aleksandar Nikolić Hall, Belgrade; Attendance: 150; Referees: Petrovic, Zrnic (SRB)
3 August 2026; 12:00	Mundt 7	(24–13)	three players 6	Aleksandar Nikolić Hall, Belgrade; Attendance: 150; Referees: Petrovic, Zrnic (SRB)
3 August 2026; 12:00	2× (suspension)	Report	3× (suspension)	Aleksandar Nikolić Hall, Belgrade; Attendance: 150; Referees: Petrovic, Zrnic (SRB)

3 August 2026; 14:30	North Macedonia	33–23	Italy	Aleksandar Nikolić Hall, Belgrade; Attendance: 100; Referees: Janz, Sug (GER)
3 August 2026; 14:30	Popovski 9	(17–13)	Belardinelli 6	Aleksandar Nikolić Hall, Belgrade; Attendance: 100; Referees: Janz, Sug (GER)
3 August 2026; 14:30	2× (suspension)	Report	3× (suspension)	Aleksandar Nikolić Hall, Belgrade; Attendance: 100; Referees: Janz, Sug (GER)

4 August 2026; 12:00	Turkey	27–29	North Macedonia	Aleksandar Nikolić Hall, Belgrade; Attendance: 80; Referees: Grapsas, Kyriakou (GRE)
4 August 2026; 12:00	Koçdemir, Karabiçak 5	(15–13)	Popovski 9	Aleksandar Nikolić Hall, Belgrade; Attendance: 80; Referees: Grapsas, Kyriakou (GRE)
4 August 2026; 12:00	3× (suspension)	Report	1× (yellow card) 3× (suspension)	Aleksandar Nikolić Hall, Belgrade; Attendance: 80; Referees: Grapsas, Kyriakou (GRE)

4 August 2026; 14:30	Italy	26–31	Sweden	Aleksandar Nikolić Hall, Belgrade; Attendance: 100; Referees: Bartkowiak, Lakomy (POL)
4 August 2026; 14:30	Imhenrion 7	(15–14)	Carlsson 8	Aleksandar Nikolić Hall, Belgrade; Attendance: 100; Referees: Bartkowiak, Lakomy (POL)
4 August 2026; 14:30	5× (suspension) 1× (red card)	Report	4× (suspension)	Aleksandar Nikolić Hall, Belgrade; Attendance: 100; Referees: Bartkowiak, Lakomy (POL)

=== Group II ===
Pos	Team	Pld	W	D	L	GF	GA	GD	Pts	Qualification
1	Israel	3	2	1	0	105	95	+10	5	9th–16th place playoffs
2	Switzerland	3	2	0	1	106	100	+6	4	17th–24th place playoffs
3	Czech Republic	3	1	1	1	96	90	+6	3	17th–24th place playoffs
4	Montenegro	3	0	0	3	83	105	−22	0	17th–24th place playoffs

Source: EHF
Rules for classification: 1) points; 2) head-to-head points; 3) head-to-head goal difference; 4) head-to-head number of goals scored; 5) Goal difference.

3 August 2026; 12:00	Czech Republic	38–28	Montenegro	CCS Šumice, Belgrade; Attendance: 100; Referees: Braganca, Xavier (POR)
3 August 2026; 12:00	Ivaškovic 6	(38–28)	Batuta 6	CCS Šumice, Belgrade; Attendance: 100; Referees: Braganca, Xavier (POR)
3 August 2026; 12:00	4× (suspension)	Report	6× (suspension)	CCS Šumice, Belgrade; Attendance: 100; Referees: Braganca, Xavier (POR)

3 August 2026; 14:30	Israel	44–38	Switzerland	CCS Šumice, Belgrade; Attendance: 120; Referees: Danilovic, Karan (BIH)
3 August 2026; 14:30	Pelach 14	(21–16)	Hunziker 9	CCS Šumice, Belgrade; Attendance: 120; Referees: Danilovic, Karan (BIH)
3 August 2026; 14:30	3× (suspension)	Report	1× (suspension)	CCS Šumice, Belgrade; Attendance: 120; Referees: Danilovic, Karan (BIH)

4 August 2026; 12:00	Montenegro	27–31	Israel	CCS Šumice, Belgrade; Attendance: 100; Referees: Janz, Sug (GER)
4 August 2026; 12:00	Kaluđerović 10	(13–16)	Pelach 14	CCS Šumice, Belgrade; Attendance: 100; Referees: Janz, Sug (GER)
4 August 2026; 12:00	1× (yellow card) 1× (suspension)	Report	1× (suspension)	CCS Šumice, Belgrade; Attendance: 100; Referees: Janz, Sug (GER)

4 August 2026; 14:30	Switzerland	32–28	Czech Republic	CCS Šumice, Belgrade; Attendance: 60; Referees: Petrovic, Zrnic (SRB)
4 August 2026; 14:30	Thomann 9	(16–13)	Štochl 5	CCS Šumice, Belgrade; Attendance: 60; Referees: Petrovic, Zrnic (SRB)
4 August 2026; 14:30	4× (suspension)	Report	1× (yellow card) 4× (suspension)	CCS Šumice, Belgrade; Attendance: 60; Referees: Petrovic, Zrnic (SRB)

=== Group III ===
Pos	Team	Pld	W	D	L	GF	GA	GD	Pts	Qualification
1	Austria	3	2	0	1	82	59	+23	4	9th–16th place playoffs
2	Norway	3	2	0	1	76	86	−10	4	17th–24th place playoffs
3	Slovakia	3	1	0	2	81	92	−11	2	17th–24th place playoffs
4	Finland	3	1	0	2	78	80	−2	2	17th–24th place playoffs

Source: EHF
Rules for classification: 1) points; 2) head-to-head points; 3) head-to-head goal difference; 4) head-to-head number of goals scored; 5) Goal difference.

3 August 2026; 12:00	Norway	15–28	Austria	Sportski Centar "Voždovac", Belgrade; Attendance: 152; Referees: H. El-Saied, Y. El-Saied (EGY)
3 August 2026; 12:00	Stømann 4	(6–11)	Kelih 8	Sportski Centar "Voždovac", Belgrade; Attendance: 152; Referees: H. El-Saied, Y. El-Saied (EGY)
3 August 2026; 12:00	1× (suspension)	Report	1× (yellow card) 2× (suspension) 1× (red card)	Sportski Centar "Voždovac", Belgrade; Attendance: 152; Referees: H. El-Saied, Y. El-Saied (EGY)

3 August 2026; 17:30	Slovakia	31–26	Finland	Sportski Centar "Voždovac", Belgrade; Attendance: 85; Referees: Bartkowiak, Lakomy (POL)
3 August 2026; 17:30	Valent 13	(15–13)	Hagman 6	Sportski Centar "Voždovac", Belgrade; Attendance: 85; Referees: Bartkowiak, Lakomy (POL)
3 August 2026; 17:30	11× (suspension)	Report	3× (suspension)	Sportski Centar "Voždovac", Belgrade; Attendance: 85; Referees: Bartkowiak, Lakomy (POL)

4 August 2026; 12:00	Austria	34–19	Slovakia	Sportski Centar "Voždovac", Belgrade; Attendance: 152; Referees: Klompers, Stobbe (NED)
4 August 2026; 12:00	Kelih 10	(14–8)	Torok 4	Sportski Centar "Voždovac", Belgrade; Attendance: 152; Referees: Klompers, Stobbe (NED)
4 August 2026; 12:00	7× (suspension)	Report	3× (suspension)	Sportski Centar "Voždovac", Belgrade; Attendance: 152; Referees: Klompers, Stobbe (NED)

4 August 2026; 14:30	Finland	27–29	Norway	Sportski Centar "Voždovac", Belgrade; Attendance: 185; Referees: Braganca, Xavier (POR)
4 August 2026; 14:30	Knaapinen 7	(13–16)	Johansen 7	Sportski Centar "Voždovac", Belgrade; Attendance: 185; Referees: Braganca, Xavier (POR)
4 August 2026; 14:30	2× (suspension)	Report	4× (suspension)	Sportski Centar "Voždovac", Belgrade; Attendance: 185; Referees: Braganca, Xavier (POR)

=== Ranking of second-placed teams ===
Pos	Grp	Team	Pld	W	D	L	GF	GA	GD	Pts	Qualification
1	I	North Macedonia	3	2	0	1	91	83	+8	4	9th–16th place playoffs
2	II	Switzerland	3	2	0	1	106	100	+6	4	17th–24th place playoffs
3	III	Norway	3	2	0	1	76	86	−10	4	17th–24th place playoffs

Source: EHF
Rules for classification: 1) points; 2) goal difference; 3) number of goals scored.

== Main round ==
=== Group I ===
Pos	Team	Pld	W	D	L	GF	GA	GD	Pts	Qualification
1	Slovenia	3	3	0	0	93	82	+11	6	Quarterfinals
2	France	3	2	0	1	86	84	+2	4	Quarterfinals
3	Germany	3	0	1	2	83	86	−3	1	Quarterfinals
4	Serbia	3	0	1	2	73	83	−10	1	9–16th place playoffs

Source: EHF
Rules for classification: 1) points; 2) head-to-head points; 3) head-to-head goal difference; 4) head-to-head number of goals scored; 5) Goal difference.

3 August 2026; 17:00	Slovenia	30–28	Germany	Aleksandar Nikolić Hall, Belgrade; Attendance: 150; Referees: Grapsas, Kyriakou (GRE)
3 August 2026; 17:00	Ilc 6	(18–13)	Faciejew, Gadza 7	Aleksandar Nikolić Hall, Belgrade; Attendance: 150; Referees: Grapsas, Kyriakou (GRE)
3 August 2026; 17:00	5× (suspension)	Report	4× (suspension) 1× (red card)	Aleksandar Nikolić Hall, Belgrade; Attendance: 150; Referees: Grapsas, Kyriakou (GRE)

3 August 2026; 19:30	France	27–22	Serbia	Aleksandar Nikolić Hall, Belgrade; Attendance: 2,000; Referees: Hummelgard, Svensson (SWE)
3 August 2026; 19:30	Garcia 5	(11–11)	Popović 7	Aleksandar Nikolić Hall, Belgrade; Attendance: 2,000; Referees: Hummelgard, Svensson (SWE)
3 August 2026; 19:30	5× (suspension)	Report	1× (yellow card) 2× (suspension)	Aleksandar Nikolić Hall, Belgrade; Attendance: 2,000; Referees: Hummelgard, Svensson (SWE)

4 August 2026; 17:00	Germany	28–29	France	Aleksandar Nikolić Hall, Belgrade; Attendance: 200; Referees: Danilovic, Karan (BIH)
4 August 2026; 17:00	Gadza 7	(16–16)	Laforce 6	Aleksandar Nikolić Hall, Belgrade; Attendance: 200; Referees: Danilovic, Karan (BIH)
4 August 2026; 17:00	1× (yellow card) 3× (suspension)	Report	2× (suspension)	Aleksandar Nikolić Hall, Belgrade; Attendance: 200; Referees: Danilovic, Karan (BIH)

4 August 2026; 19:30	Serbia	24–29	Slovenia	Aleksandar Nikolić Hall, Belgrade; Attendance: 1,500; Referees: Panetta, Riello (ITA)
4 August 2026; 19:30	Stojanović 7	(12–14)	Kovač 7	Aleksandar Nikolić Hall, Belgrade; Attendance: 1,500; Referees: Panetta, Riello (ITA)
4 August 2026; 19:30	5× (suspension)	Report	6× (suspension)	Aleksandar Nikolić Hall, Belgrade; Attendance: 1,500; Referees: Panetta, Riello (ITA)

=== Group II ===
Pos	Team	Pld	W	D	L	GF	GA	GD	Pts	Qualification
1	Iceland	3	3	0	0	119	86	+33	6	Quarterfinals
2	Hungary	3	2	0	1	110	108	+2	4	Quarterfinals
3	Croatia	3	1	0	2	87	98	−11	2	Quarterfinals
4	Portugal	3	0	0	3	88	112	−24	0	9–16th place playoffs

Source: EHF
Rules for classification: 1) points; 2) head-to-head points; 3) head-to-head goal difference; 4) head-to-head number of goals scored; 5) Goal difference.

3 August 2026; 17:00	Croatia	29–37	Iceland	CCS Šumice, Belgrade; Attendance: 150; Referees: Klompers, Stobbe (NED)
3 August 2026; 17:00	Bajan 6	(11–17)	Arndal 11	CCS Šumice, Belgrade; Attendance: 150; Referees: Klompers, Stobbe (NED)
3 August 2026; 17:00	7× (suspension)	Report	1× (yellow card) 4× (suspension)	CCS Šumice, Belgrade; Attendance: 150; Referees: Klompers, Stobbe (NED)

3 August 2026; 19:30	Portugal	35–45	Hungary	CCS Šumice, Belgrade; Attendance: 150; Referees: Ivanovic, Kaludjerovic (MNE)
3 August 2026; 19:30	Marques 9	(14–18)	Ambrus 11	CCS Šumice, Belgrade; Attendance: 150; Referees: Ivanovic, Kaludjerovic (MNE)
3 August 2026; 19:30	1× (yellow card) 4× (suspension) 1× (red card)	Report	1× (suspension)	CCS Šumice, Belgrade; Attendance: 150; Referees: Ivanovic, Kaludjerovic (MNE)

4 August 2026; 17:00	Iceland	41–29	Portugal	CCS Šumice, Belgrade; Attendance: 120; Referees: Hardegger, Hardegger (SUI)
4 August 2026; 17:00	Aronsson 9	(18–12)	Marques 8	CCS Šumice, Belgrade; Attendance: 120; Referees: Hardegger, Hardegger (SUI)
4 August 2026; 17:00	1× (yellow card) 4× (suspension) 1× (red card)	Report	6× (suspension) 1× (red card)	CCS Šumice, Belgrade; Attendance: 120; Referees: Hardegger, Hardegger (SUI)

4 August 2026; 19:30	Hungary	37–32	Croatia	CCS Šumice, Belgrade; Attendance: 100; Referees: Hummelgard, Svensson (SWE)
4 August 2026; 19:30	Ambrus, Körösi 7	(14–16)	Bajan 6	CCS Šumice, Belgrade; Attendance: 100; Referees: Hummelgard, Svensson (SWE)
4 August 2026; 19:30	3× (suspension)	Report	4× (suspension)	CCS Šumice, Belgrade; Attendance: 100; Referees: Hummelgard, Svensson (SWE)

=== Group III ===
Pos	Team	Pld	W	D	L	GF	GA	GD	Pts	Qualification
1	Denmark	3	3	0	0	99	80	+19	6	Quarterfinals
2	Spain	3	2	0	1	99	94	+5	4	Quarterfinals
3	Faroe Islands	3	0	1	2	94	104	−10	1	9–16th place playoffs
4	Poland	3	0	1	2	88	102	−14	1	9–16th place playoffs

Source: EHF
Rules for classification: 1) points; 2) head-to-head points; 3) head-to-head goal difference; 4) head-to-head number of goals scored; 5) Goal difference.

3 August 2026; 17:00	Poland	35–35	Faroe Islands	Sportski Centar "Voždovac", Belgrade; Attendance: 100; Referees: L. Hardegger, S. Hardegger (SUI)
3 August 2026; 17:00	Tkaczyk 7	(16–15)	á Skipagøtu 12	Sportski Centar "Voždovac", Belgrade; Attendance: 100; Referees: L. Hardegger, S. Hardegger (SUI)
3 August 2026; 17:00	1× (yellow card) 4× (suspension)	Report	1× (yellow card) 1× (suspension)	Sportski Centar "Voždovac", Belgrade; Attendance: 100; Referees: L. Hardegger, S. Hardegger (SUI)

3 August 2026; 19:30	Denmark	32–30	Spain	Sportski Centar "Voždovac", Belgrade; Attendance: 120; Referees: Panetta, Riello (ITA)
3 August 2026; 19:30	Bak 11	(16–17)	Sola 12	Sportski Centar "Voždovac", Belgrade; Attendance: 120; Referees: Panetta, Riello (ITA)
3 August 2026; 19:30	1× (yellow card) 4× (suspension)	Report	1× (yellow card) 7× (suspension)	Sportski Centar "Voždovac", Belgrade; Attendance: 120; Referees: Panetta, Riello (ITA)

4 August 2026; 17:00	Spain	32–30	Poland	Sportski Centar "Voždovac", Belgrade; Attendance: 100; Referees: Cipov, Klus (SVK)
4 August 2026; 17:00	Sola 10	(16–14)	Skiba 7	Sportski Centar "Voždovac", Belgrade; Attendance: 100; Referees: Cipov, Klus (SVK)
4 August 2026; 17:00	4× (suspension)	Report	3× (suspension)	Sportski Centar "Voždovac", Belgrade; Attendance: 100; Referees: Cipov, Klus (SVK)

4 August 2026; 19:30	Faroe Islands	27–32	Denmark	Sportski Centar "Voždovac", Belgrade; Attendance: 100; Referees: Elsaied, Elsaied (EGY)
4 August 2026; 19:30	á Skipagøtu 12	(13–16)	Bak 6	Sportski Centar "Voždovac", Belgrade; Attendance: 100; Referees: Elsaied, Elsaied (EGY)
4 August 2026; 19:30	2× (suspension)	Report	5× (suspension)	Sportski Centar "Voždovac", Belgrade; Attendance: 100; Referees: Elsaied, Elsaied (EGY)

=== Ranking of third-placed teams ===
Pos	Grp	Team	Pld	W	D	L	GF	GA	GD	Pts	Qualification
1	II	Croatia	3	1	0	2	87	98	−11	2	Quarterfinals
2	I	Germany	3	0	1	2	83	86	−3	1	Quarterfinals
3	III	Faroe Islands	3	0	1	2	94	104	−10	1	9th–16th place playoffs

Source: EHF
Rules for classification: 1) points; 2) goal difference; 3) number of goals scored.

== 17th–24th place playoffs ==
21th place match
Italy	27
Czech Republic	39
23th place match
Turkey	26
Montenegro	28

21–24 place semifinals
Turkey	32
Italy	35
Montenegro	27
Czech Republic	31

17th–24th place quarterfinals
Switzerland	39
Turkey	32
Italy	37
Slovakia	38
Norway	25
Montenegro	24
Czech Republic	29
Finland	30

17th–20th place semifinals
Switzerland	49
Slovakia	37
Norway	32
Finland	27

17th place match
Switzerland	40
Norway	34
19th place match
Slovakia	40
Finland	20

=== 17th–24th place quarterfinals ===
6 August 2026; 12:00	Switzerland	39–32	Turkey	CCS Šumice, Belgrade; Attendance: 100; Referees: Danilovic, Karan (BIH)
6 August 2026; 12:00	Thomann 9	(24–18)	Uyman 8	CCS Šumice, Belgrade; Attendance: 100; Referees: Danilovic, Karan (BIH)
6 August 2026; 12:00		Report	2× (suspension)	CCS Šumice, Belgrade; Attendance: 100; Referees: Danilovic, Karan (BIH)

6 August 2026; 14:30	Italy	37–38	Slovakia	CCS Šumice, Belgrade; Attendance: 80; Referees: Petrovic, Zrnic (SRB)
6 August 2026; 14:30	Belardinelli 12	(17–22)	Stanovský 9	CCS Šumice, Belgrade; Attendance: 80; Referees: Petrovic, Zrnic (SRB)
6 August 2026; 14:30	1× (yellow card) 2× (suspension)	Report	6× (suspension)	CCS Šumice, Belgrade; Attendance: 80; Referees: Petrovic, Zrnic (SRB)

6 August 2026; 17:30	Norway	25–24	Montenegro	CCS Šumice, Belgrade; Attendance: 91; Referees: Bartkowiak, Lakomy (POL)
6 August 2026; 17:30	Johansen 6	(11–12)	Potpara 7	CCS Šumice, Belgrade; Attendance: 91; Referees: Bartkowiak, Lakomy (POL)
6 August 2026; 17:30	1× (suspension)	Report	3× (suspension)	CCS Šumice, Belgrade; Attendance: 91; Referees: Bartkowiak, Lakomy (POL)

6 August 2026; 19:30	Czech Republic	29–30	Finland	CCS Šumice, Belgrade; Attendance: 70; Referees: Grapsas, Kyriakou (GRE)
6 August 2026; 19:30	Štochl 7	(18–17)	Hedlund 6	CCS Šumice, Belgrade; Attendance: 70; Referees: Grapsas, Kyriakou (GRE)
6 August 2026; 19:30	3× (suspension)	Report	5× (suspension)	CCS Šumice, Belgrade; Attendance: 70; Referees: Grapsas, Kyriakou (GRE)

=== 21st–24th place semifinals ===
7 August 2026; 12:00	Turkey	32–35	Italy	CCS Šumice, Belgrade; Attendance: 100; Referees: Braganca, Xavier (POR)
7 August 2026; 12:00	Şimşek 10	(17–21)	Drandic 8	CCS Šumice, Belgrade; Attendance: 100; Referees: Braganca, Xavier (POR)
7 August 2026; 12:00	3× (suspension)	Report	1× (yellow card) 2× (suspension)	CCS Šumice, Belgrade; Attendance: 100; Referees: Braganca, Xavier (POR)

7 August 2026; 17:00	Montenegro	27–41	Czech Republic	CCS Šumice, Belgrade; Attendance: 80; Referees: Hummelgard, Svensson (SWE)
7 August 2026; 17:00	Batuta, Potpara 7	(13–21)	Štochl 8	CCS Šumice, Belgrade; Attendance: 80; Referees: Hummelgard, Svensson (SWE)
7 August 2026; 17:00	1× (yellow card) 4× (suspension)	Report	1× (suspension)	CCS Šumice, Belgrade; Attendance: 80; Referees: Hummelgard, Svensson (SWE)

=== 23rd place match ===
9 August 2026; 9:30	Turkey	26–28	Montenegro	CCS Šumice, Belgrade; Attendance: 80; Referees: Petrovic, Zrinc (SRB)
9 August 2026; 9:30	Tan 6	(14–15)	Gutic 1	CCS Šumice, Belgrade; Attendance: 80; Referees: Petrovic, Zrinc (SRB)
9 August 2026; 9:30	2× (suspension)	Report	3× (suspension) 1× (red card)	CCS Šumice, Belgrade; Attendance: 80; Referees: Petrovic, Zrinc (SRB)

=== 21st place match ===
9 August 2026; 12:00	Italy	27–39	Czech Republic	CCS Šumice, Belgrade; Attendance: 80; Referees: Klompers, Stobbe (NED)
9 August 2026; 12:00	Agrillo 9	(13–17)	Štochl 14	CCS Šumice, Belgrade; Attendance: 80; Referees: Klompers, Stobbe (NED)
9 August 2026; 12:00	4× (suspension) 1× (red card)	Report	1× (yellow card) 5× (suspension) 1× (red card)	CCS Šumice, Belgrade; Attendance: 80; Referees: Klompers, Stobbe (NED)

=== 17th–20th place semifinals ===
7 August 2026; 14:30	Switzerland	49–37	Slovakia	CCS Šumice, Belgrade; Attendance: 100; Referees: Grapsas, Kyriakou (GRE)
7 August 2026; 14:30	Zimmermann 17	(23–19)	Torok 7	CCS Šumice, Belgrade; Attendance: 100; Referees: Grapsas, Kyriakou (GRE)
7 August 2026; 14:30	5× (suspension)	Report	4× (suspension)	CCS Šumice, Belgrade; Attendance: 100; Referees: Grapsas, Kyriakou (GRE)

7 August 2026; 19:30	Norway	32–27	Finland	CCS Šumice, Belgrade; Attendance: 100; Referees: Petrovic, Zrnic (SRB)
7 August 2026; 19:30	Dolva 7	(20–13)	Knaapinen 7	CCS Šumice, Belgrade; Attendance: 100; Referees: Petrovic, Zrnic (SRB)
7 August 2026; 19:30	1× (yellow card) 4× (suspension)	Report	1× (suspension)	CCS Šumice, Belgrade; Attendance: 100; Referees: Petrovic, Zrnic (SRB)

=== 19th place match ===
9 August 2026; 9:30	Slovakia	40–25	Finland	Sportski Centar "Voždovac", Belgrade; Attendance: 43; Referees: Ivanovic, Kaludjerovic (MNE)
9 August 2026; 9:30	Krkoška	(20–12)	Kurppa, Hagman 7	Sportski Centar "Voždovac", Belgrade; Attendance: 43; Referees: Ivanovic, Kaludjerovic (MNE)
9 August 2026; 9:30	6× (suspension)	Report	2× (yellow card) 6× (suspension) 1× (red card)	Sportski Centar "Voždovac", Belgrade; Attendance: 43; Referees: Ivanovic, Kaludjerovic (MNE)

=== 17th place match ===
9 August 2026; 9:30	Switzerland	40–34	Norway	Aleksandar Nikolić Hall, Belgrade; Attendance: 50; Referees: Janz, Sug (GER)
9 August 2026; 9:30	Thomann 17	(21–15)	Sperre, Brogård 6	Aleksandar Nikolić Hall, Belgrade; Attendance: 50; Referees: Janz, Sug (GER)
9 August 2026; 9:30	1× (suspension)	Report	4× (suspension)	Aleksandar Nikolić Hall, Belgrade; Attendance: 50; Referees: Janz, Sug (GER)

== 9th–16th place playoffs ==
13th place match
Sweden	39
Serbia	38
15th place match
Faroe Islands	35
Poland	41

13th–16th place semifinals
Faroe Islands	34
Sweden	35
Serbia	35
Poland	28

9th–16th place quarterfinals
Faroe Islands	32
North Macedonia	34
Portugal	32
Sweden	28
Serbia	29
Austria	31
Poland	34
Israel	35

9th–12th place semifinals
North Macedonia	26
Portugal	25
Austria	22
Israel	31

9th place match
North Macedonia	39
Israel	29
11rd place match
Portugal	33
Austria	31

=== 9th–16 place quarterfinals ===
6 August 2026; 12:00	Faroe Islands	32–34	North Macedonia	Aleksandar Nikolić Hall, Belgrade; Attendance: 120; Referees: Panetta, Riello (ITA)
6 August 2026; 12:00	á Skipagøtu 12	(13–18)	Gjorgieski, Gjorgjievski 7	Aleksandar Nikolić Hall, Belgrade; Attendance: 120; Referees: Panetta, Riello (ITA)
6 August 2026; 12:00	6× (suspension) 2× (red card)	Report	10× (suspension) 2× (red card)	Aleksandar Nikolić Hall, Belgrade; Attendance: 120; Referees: Panetta, Riello (ITA)

6 August 2026; 12:00	Portugal	32–28	Sweden	Sportski Centar "Voždovac", Belgrade; Attendance: 120; Referees: Janz, Sug (GER)
6 August 2026; 12:00	Marques, Almeida 9	(15–8)	Sandberg 7	Sportski Centar "Voždovac", Belgrade; Attendance: 120; Referees: Janz, Sug (GER)
6 August 2026; 12:00	1× (yellow card) 4× (suspension)	Report	2× (suspension)	Sportski Centar "Voždovac", Belgrade; Attendance: 120; Referees: Janz, Sug (GER)

6 August 2026; 14:30	Serbia	29–31	Austria	Aleksandar Nikolić Hall, Belgrade; Attendance: 500; Referees: H. El-Saied, Y. El-Saied (EGY)
6 August 2026; 14:30	Popovic 10	(11–14)	Kopeinigg 9	Aleksandar Nikolić Hall, Belgrade; Attendance: 500; Referees: H. El-Saied, Y. El-Saied (EGY)
6 August 2026; 14:30	4× (suspension)	Report	1× (yellow card) 6× (suspension)	Aleksandar Nikolić Hall, Belgrade; Attendance: 500; Referees: H. El-Saied, Y. El-Saied (EGY)

6 August 2026; 14:30	Poland	34–35	Israel	Sportski Centar "Voždovac", Belgrade; Attendance: 100; Referees: Ivanovic, Kaludjerovic (MNE)
6 August 2026; 14:30	Kruszelnicki 10	(20–20)	Pelach 19	Sportski Centar "Voždovac", Belgrade; Attendance: 100; Referees: Ivanovic, Kaludjerovic (MNE)
6 August 2026; 14:30	1× (yellow card) 7× (suspension)	Report	4× (suspension)	Sportski Centar "Voždovac", Belgrade; Attendance: 100; Referees: Ivanovic, Kaludjerovic (MNE)

=== 13th–16th place semifinals ===
7 August 2026; 12:00	Faroe Islands	34–35	Sweden	Sportski Centar "Voždovac", Belgrade; Attendance: 80; Referees: Cipov, Klus (SVK)
7 August 2026; 12:00	á Skipagøtu 15	(16–17)	Carlsson 9	Sportski Centar "Voždovac", Belgrade; Attendance: 80; Referees: Cipov, Klus (SVK)
7 August 2026; 12:00	2× (suspension)	Report	6× (suspension) 1× (red card)	Sportski Centar "Voždovac", Belgrade; Attendance: 80; Referees: Cipov, Klus (SVK)

7 August 2026; 14:30	Serbia	35–28	Poland	Sportski Centar "Voždovac", Belgrade; Attendance: 300; Referees: L. Hardegger, S. Hardegger (SUI)
7 August 2026; 14:30	Blecic 11	(18–11)	Kruszelnicki, Skiba 7	Sportski Centar "Voždovac", Belgrade; Attendance: 300; Referees: L. Hardegger, S. Hardegger (SUI)
7 August 2026; 14:30	6× (suspension)	Report	6× (suspension) 1× (red card)	Sportski Centar "Voždovac", Belgrade; Attendance: 300; Referees: L. Hardegger, S. Hardegger (SUI)

=== 15th place match ===
9 August 2026; 12:00	Faroe Islands	35–41	Poland	CCS Šumice, Belgrade; Attendance: 100; Referees: Braganca, Xavier (POR)
9 August 2026; 12:00	á Skipagøtu 11	(19–18)	Tkaczyk 8	CCS Šumice, Belgrade; Attendance: 100; Referees: Braganca, Xavier (POR)
9 August 2026; 12:00	7× (suspension)	Report	7× (suspension)	CCS Šumice, Belgrade; Attendance: 100; Referees: Braganca, Xavier (POR)

=== 13th place match ===
9 August 2026; 12:00	Sweden	39–38	Serbia	Aleksandar Nikolić Hall, Belgrade; Attendance: 350; Referees: Panetta, Riello (ITA)
9 August 2026; 12:00	Carlson, Pastuhovic 8	(22–18)	Stojinovic	Aleksandar Nikolić Hall, Belgrade; Attendance: 350; Referees: Panetta, Riello (ITA)
9 August 2026; 12:00	4× (suspension) 1× (red card)	Report	3× (suspension) 1× (red card)	Aleksandar Nikolić Hall, Belgrade; Attendance: 350; Referees: Panetta, Riello (ITA)

=== 9th–12th place semifinals ===
7 August 2026; 12:00	North Macedonia	26–25	Portugal	Sportski Centar "Voždovac", Belgrade; Attendance: 300; Referees: Bartkowiak, Lakomy (POL)
7 August 2026; 12:00	Damchevski 7	(13–9)	Marques 9	Sportski Centar "Voždovac", Belgrade; Attendance: 300; Referees: Bartkowiak, Lakomy (POL)
7 August 2026; 12:00	1× (yellow card) 2× (suspension)	Report	3× (suspension) 2× (red card)	Sportski Centar "Voždovac", Belgrade; Attendance: 300; Referees: Bartkowiak, Lakomy (POL)

7 August 2026; 14:30	Austria	22–31	Israel	Sportski Centar "Voždovac", Belgrade; Attendance: 150; Referees: Janz, Sug (GER)
7 August 2026; 14:30	Cirit 8	(10–16)	Pelach 15	Sportski Centar "Voždovac", Belgrade; Attendance: 150; Referees: Janz, Sug (GER)
7 August 2026; 14:30	1× (suspension)	Report	1× (suspension) 1× (red card)	Sportski Centar "Voždovac", Belgrade; Attendance: 150; Referees: Janz, Sug (GER)

=== 11th place match ===
9 August 2026; 14:30	Portugal	33–31	Austria	CCS Šumice, Belgrade; Attendance: 80; Referees: Grapsas, Kyriakou (GRE)
9 August 2026; 14:30	Correia Leite 7	(15–13)	Kopeinigg 10	CCS Šumice, Belgrade; Attendance: 80; Referees: Grapsas, Kyriakou (GRE)
9 August 2026; 14:30	4× (suspension)	Report	4× (suspension)	CCS Šumice, Belgrade; Attendance: 80; Referees: Grapsas, Kyriakou (GRE)

=== 9th place match ===
9 August 2026; 14:30	North Macedonia	39–29	Israel	Sportski Centar "Voždovac", Belgrade; Attendance: 100; Referees: Hummelgard, Svennson (SWE)
9 August 2026; 14:30	Gjorieski, Damchevski 8	(19–20)	Mesika 9	Sportski Centar "Voždovac", Belgrade; Attendance: 100; Referees: Hummelgard, Svennson (SWE)
9 August 2026; 14:30	4× (suspension)	Report	6× (suspension)	Sportski Centar "Voždovac", Belgrade; Attendance: 100; Referees: Hummelgard, Svennson (SWE)

== Championship playoffs ==
5th place match
Iceland	35
Hungary	31
7th place match
France	36
Croatia	29

5th–8th place semifinals
Iceland	37
France	34
Croatia	28
Hungary	31

Quarterfinals
Iceland	31
Germany	33
Spain	29
France	27
Denmark	38
Croatia	30
Slovenia	32
Hungary	27

Semifinals
Germany	32
Spain	27
Denmark	17
Slovenia	26

Final
Germany	36
Slovenia	27
3rd place match
Spain	25
Denmark	28

=== Quarterfinals ===
6 August 2026; 17:00	Iceland	31–33	Germany	Sportski Centar "Voždovac", Belgrade; Attendance: 200; Referees: Braganca, Xavier (POR)
6 August 2026; 17:00	Aronsson 6	(15–16)	Eisend 9	Sportski Centar "Voždovac", Belgrade; Attendance: 200; Referees: Braganca, Xavier (POR)
6 August 2026; 17:00	1× (yellow card) 7× (suspension) 2× (red card)	Report	8× (suspension) 1× (red card)	Sportski Centar "Voždovac", Belgrade; Attendance: 200; Referees: Braganca, Xavier (POR)

6 August 2026; 17:00	Spain	29–27	France	Aleksandar Nikolić Hall, Belgrade; Attendance: 300; Referees: L. Hardegger, S. Hardegger (SUI)
6 August 2026; 17:00	Sola 11	(15–13)	Aletcheredji 6	Aleksandar Nikolić Hall, Belgrade; Attendance: 300; Referees: L. Hardegger, S. Hardegger (SUI)
6 August 2026; 17:00	3× (suspension)	Report	2× (suspension) 1× (red card)	Aleksandar Nikolić Hall, Belgrade; Attendance: 300; Referees: L. Hardegger, S. Hardegger (SUI)

6 August 2026; 19:30	Denmark	38–30	Croatia	Sportski Centar "Voždovac", Belgrade; Attendance: 75; Referees: Cipov, Klus
6 August 2026; 19:30	Bak, Andreasen 9	(18–13)	Vacek 6	Sportski Centar "Voždovac", Belgrade; Attendance: 75; Referees: Cipov, Klus
6 August 2026; 19:30	1× (suspension)	Report	5× (suspension) 1× (red card)	Sportski Centar "Voždovac", Belgrade; Attendance: 75; Referees: Cipov, Klus

6 August 2026; 19:30	Slovenia	32–27	Hungary	Aleksandar Nikolić Hall, Belgrade; Attendance: 150; Referees: Klompers, Stoobe (NED)
6 August 2026; 19:30	Podvršič 10	(17–12)	Tóth 5	Aleksandar Nikolić Hall, Belgrade; Attendance: 150; Referees: Klompers, Stoobe (NED)
6 August 2026; 19:30	2× (suspension)	Report	3× (suspension)	Aleksandar Nikolić Hall, Belgrade; Attendance: 150; Referees: Klompers, Stoobe (NED)

=== 5th–8th place semifinals ===
7 August 2026; 17:00	Iceland	37–34	France	Sportski Centar "Voždovac", Belgrade; Attendance: 89; Referees: Danilovic, Karan (BIH)
7 August 2026; 17:00	Aronsson 11	(20–16)	Saillard 7	Sportski Centar "Voždovac", Belgrade; Attendance: 89; Referees: Danilovic, Karan (BIH)
7 August 2026; 17:00	4× (suspension)	Report	2× (suspension)	Sportski Centar "Voždovac", Belgrade; Attendance: 89; Referees: Danilovic, Karan (BIH)

7 August 2026; 19:30	Croatia	28–31	Hungary	Sportski Centar "Voždovac", Belgrade; Attendance: 80; Referees: H. El-Saied, Y. El-Saied
7 August 2026; 19:30	Bajan 7	(17–16)	Ambrus 9	Sportski Centar "Voždovac", Belgrade; Attendance: 80; Referees: H. El-Saied, Y. El-Saied
7 August 2026; 19:30	3× (suspension) 1× (red card)	Report	3× (suspension)	Sportski Centar "Voždovac", Belgrade; Attendance: 80; Referees: H. El-Saied, Y. El-Saied

=== 7th place match ===
9 August 2026; 17:00	France	36–29	Croatia	Sportski Centar "Voždovac", Belgrade; Attendance: 80; Referees: Bartkowiak, Lakomy (POL)
9 August 2026; 17:00	Dermigny, Saillard 8	(16–15)	Bajan	Sportski Centar "Voždovac", Belgrade; Attendance: 80; Referees: Bartkowiak, Lakomy (POL)
9 August 2026; 17:00	3× (suspension)	Report	3× (suspension)	Sportski Centar "Voždovac", Belgrade; Attendance: 80; Referees: Bartkowiak, Lakomy (POL)

=== 5th place match ===
9 August 2026; 14:30	Iceland	35–31	Hungary	Aleksandar Nikolić Hall, Belgrade; Attendance: 100; Referees: L. Harddger, S. Hardegger (SUI)
9 August 2026; 14:30	Sigurgeirsson 8	(17–17)	Juhász-Tóth 8	Aleksandar Nikolić Hall, Belgrade; Attendance: 100; Referees: L. Harddger, S. Hardegger (SUI)
9 August 2026; 14:30	1× (yellow card) 4× (suspension) 2× (red card)	Report	4× (suspension)	Aleksandar Nikolić Hall, Belgrade; Attendance: 100; Referees: L. Harddger, S. Hardegger (SUI)

=== Semifinals ===
7 August 2026; 17:00	Germany	32–27	Spain	Aleksandar Nikolić Hall, Belgrade; Attendance: 500; Referees: Ivanovic, Kaludjerovic (MNE)
7 August 2026; 17:00	Pöthke 8	(10–11)	Sola Basterra 7	Aleksandar Nikolić Hall, Belgrade; Attendance: 500; Referees: Ivanovic, Kaludjerovic (MNE)
7 August 2026; 17:00	7× (suspension) 1× (red card)	Report	4× (suspension) 1× (red card)	Aleksandar Nikolić Hall, Belgrade; Attendance: 500; Referees: Ivanovic, Kaludjerovic (MNE)

7 August 2026; 19:30	Denmark	17–26	Slovenia	Aleksandar Nikolić Hall, Belgrade; Attendance: 350; Referees: Panetta, Riello (ITA)
7 August 2026; 19:30	Laursen 4	(10–11)	Kresal 5	Aleksandar Nikolić Hall, Belgrade; Attendance: 350; Referees: Panetta, Riello (ITA)
7 August 2026; 19:30	1× (yellow card) 5× (suspension)	Report	1× (yellow card) 4× (suspension)	Aleksandar Nikolić Hall, Belgrade; Attendance: 350; Referees: Panetta, Riello (ITA)

=== Third place game ===
9 August 2026; 17:00	Spain	25–28	Denmark	Aleksandar Nikolić Hall, Belgrade; Attendance: 250; Referees: Danilovic, Karan (BIH)
9 August 2026; 17:00	Basterra 6	(13–18)	Andreasen 8	Aleksandar Nikolić Hall, Belgrade; Attendance: 250; Referees: Danilovic, Karan (BIH)
9 August 2026; 17:00		Report	2× (suspension)	Aleksandar Nikolić Hall, Belgrade; Attendance: 250; Referees: Danilovic, Karan (BIH)

=== Final ===
9 August 2026; 19:30	Germany	36–27	Slovenia	Aleksandar Nikolić Hall, Belgrade; Attendance: 1500; Referees: Cipov, Klus (BIH)
9 August 2026; 19:30	Faciejew 8	(17–11)	three players 3	Aleksandar Nikolić Hall, Belgrade; Attendance: 1500; Referees: Cipov, Klus (BIH)
9 August 2026; 19:30	8× (suspension)	Report	4× (suspension)	Aleksandar Nikolić Hall, Belgrade; Attendance: 1500; Referees: Cipov, Klus (BIH)

== Final standings ==
Rank	Team
1st place, gold medalist(s)	Germany
2nd place, silver medalist(s)	Slovenia
3rd place, bronze medalist(s)	Denmark
4	Spain
5	Iceland
6	Hungary
7	France
8	Croatia
9	North Macedonia
10	Israel
11	Portugal
12	Austria

Rank	Team
13	Sweden
14	Serbia
15	Poland
16	Faroe Islands
17	Switzerland
18	Norway
19	Slovakia
20	Finland
21	Czech Republic
22	Italy
23	Montenegro
24	Turkey

== Awards ==
Award	Player
Most Valuable Player	Jaka Podvrsic (SLO)
Best Defence Player	Tjaš Erčulj (SLO)
Topscorer	Yonathan Pelach (ISR) (97 goals)

All-Star Team

Position	Player
Goalkeeper	Tjorven Knackstedt (GER)
Right wing	Maks Ilc (SLO)
Right back	Adrian Sola (ESP)
Centre back	Emil Bak (DEN)
Left back	Julius Eisend (GER)
Left wing	Alex Unnar Hallgrímsson (ISL)
Pivot	Malte Elze (GER)
