= European Men's U-18 Handball Championship =

International youth handball competition

European Men's Youth Handball Championship
- Status: active
- Genre: sports event
- Date: midyear
- Frequency: annual
- Country: varying
- Inaugurated: 1992

The European Men's Youth Handball Championship, is the official competition for youth men's handball national handball teams in Europe, held by the European Handball Federation every second year. Since the 2004 edition, the championship received its current name: EHF European Men's U-18 Handball Championship.

In addition to crowning the European champions, the tournament also serves as a qualifying tournament for the IHF Youth World Handball Championship.

== Tournaments ==
Year	Host country	Gold medal game			Bronze medal game		
Year	Host country	Gold	Score	Silver	Bronze	Score	Fourth place
1992; Details	Switzerland	Portugal	30–26	Russia	Spain	23–19	Norway
1994; Details	Israel	Spain	16–15	Portugal	Denmark	28—21	Israel
1997; Details	Estonia	Sweden	28–24	Czech Republic	Hungary	27–20	Greece
1999; Details	Portugal	Hungary	24–23	Spain	Denmark	22–19	Russia
2001; Details	Luxembourg	Russia	27–24	Denmark	Sweden	37–19	Romania
2003; Details	Slovakia	Iceland	27–23	Germany	Denmark	29–19	Sweden
2004; Details	(Serbia and Montenegro); Serbia & Montenegro	Serbia & Montenegro	27–20	Croatia	Denmark	27–25	Slovenia
2006; Details	Estonia	Croatia	30–24	Denmark	Sweden	34–28	Poland
2008; Details	Czech Republic	Germany	31–27	Denmark	Sweden	42–35	Iceland
2010; Details	Montenegro	Croatia	27–26	Spain	Denmark	28–27	Germany
2012; Details	Austria	Germany	30–29	Sweden	Denmark	37–32	Spain
2014; Details	Poland	France	33–30	Hungary	Spain	27–21	Denmark
2016; Details	Croatia	France	40–38	Croatia	Germany	32–31	Slovenia
2018; Details	Croatia	Sweden	32–27	Iceland	Denmark	26–24	Croatia
2020	Slovenia	Cancelled due to the COVID-19 pandemic					
2021^{[a]} Details	Croatia	Germany	34–20	Croatia	Spain	37–28	Slovenia
2022; Details	Montenegro	Spain	34–32	Sweden	Germany	29–22	Hungary
2024; Details	Montenegro	Sweden	37–36 (ET)	Denmark	Hungary	36–34 (ET)	Iceland
2026; Details	Serbia	Germany	36–27	Slovenia	Denmark	28–25	Spain
2028; Details	North Macedonia						

^{a} The European Handball Federation decided to hold an U-19 European Championship in 2021, in a move to lessen the COVID-19 pandemic's impact for national team players born in 2002.

== Medal table ==
Rank	Nation	Gold	Silver	Bronze	Total
1	Germany	4	1	2	7
2	Sweden	3	2	3	8
3	Croatia	2	3	0	5
4	Spain	2	2	3	7
5	France	2	0	0	2
6	Hungary	1	1	2	4
7	Iceland	1	1	0	2
7	Portugal	1	1	0	2
7	Russia	1	1	0	2
10	Serbia and Montenegro	1	0	0	1
11	Denmark	0	4	8	12
12	Czech Republic	0	1	0	1
12	Slovenia	0	1	0	1
Totals (13 entries)		18	18	18	54

=== Participating nations ===
Nation	(Switzerland) 1992	(Israel) 1994	(Estonia) 1997	(Portugal) 1999	(Luxembourg) 2001	(Slovakia) 2003	(Serbia and Montenegro) 2004	(Estonia) 2006	(Czech Republic) 2008	(Montenegro) 2010	(Austria) 2012	(Poland) 2014	(Croatia) 2016	(Croatia) 2018	(Croatia) 2021	(Montenegro) 2022	(Montenegro) 2024	(Serbia) 2026	Total
Austria	7				8			14			6				16		16	12	7
Belarus							8				8	11							3
Bosnia and Herzegovina									11										1
Bulgaria							16												1
Croatia				7	9	11	2	1	5	1	7	10	2	4	2	5	13	8	15
Czech Republic		D	2					15	13	11	14	14	15				14	21	9
Denmark		D	6	3	2	3	3	2	2	3	3	4	5	3	5	6	2	3	16
Estonia			11				14	12											3
Faroe Islands																9	15	16	3
Finland									16		16							20	3
France				11	5	10	9	6	7		12	1	1	7	10	14	12	7	14
Germany	5			9		2	5	9	1	4	1	7	3	6	1	3	5	1	15
Greece		D	4														20		2
Hungary		D	3	1	11	8	10	10	12			2		10	9	4	3	6	13
Iceland						1	12		4	12	15	9	7	2	8	10	4	5	12
Israel	6	D	12											14	14		17	10	7
Italy															12	16	21	22	4
Luxembourg					10														1
Montenegro										15						12	23	23	4
North Macedonia		D										15					19	9	3
Norway	4			11					8	13	9		12	11	11	7		18	10
Poland				6				4		10		8	13	15		15	18	15	9
Portugal	1	2		8		7				14			10	12	6	8	10	11	11
Romania		D			4						11	16		16			22		5
Russia	2	D		4	1	12	11	16	14	9		12	11	13	15				13
Serbia									10	5	10	13	8	8	13	13	6	14	10
Serbia and Montenegro						6	1	7											3
Slovakia				12	6	9	6	11	15	16			16					19	9
Slovenia			5	5	7	5	4	13	9	8	5		4	9	4	11	9	2	15
Spain	3	1	8	2				5	6	2	4	3	6	5	3	1	8	4	15
Sweden		D	1		3	4	7	3	3	7	2	5	9	1	7	2	1	13	15
Switzerland	8						13				13	6	14				11	17	7
Turkey								8										24	2
Ukraine			10														24		1
Yugoslavia			7																1
Total	8	11	12	12	12	12	16	16	16	16	16	16	16	16	16	16	24	24	
