= Mitja Janc =

Slovenian handball player

Personal information
- Nationality: Slovenian
- Born: 5 April 2003 (age 23) Brežice, Slovenia
- Height: 1.85 m (6 ft 1 in)

Sport
- Sport: Handball
- Position: Centre back
- Current club: Wisła Płock
- Number: 8

Youth career
- Years: Team
- 2013–2018: RK Sevnica
- 2018–2021: RK Celje

Senior clubs
- Years: Team
- 2020–2024: RK Celje
- 2021–2022: → RK Maribor Branik (loan)
- 2024–: Wisła Płock
National team
Years	Team	Apps	(Gls)
2024–	Slovenia	1	(0)
- Updated on 12 June 2024

Mitja Janc (born 5 April 2003) is a Slovenian handball player who plays for Wisła Płock.

He participated at the 2021 European Men's U-19 Handball Championship, where he became the top scorer and was selected as the most valuable player. In addition, he was selected in the all-star team as the best centre back. He also participated at the 2022 European Men's Under-20 Handball Championship and the 2023 Men's Junior World Handball Championship.
