= Elliot Stenmalm =

Swedish handball player (born 2002)

Personal information
- Full name: Elliot Vincent Henrik Stenmalm
- Nationality: Swedish
- Born: 4 May 2002 (age 24) Växjö, Sweden
- Height: 2.00 m (6 ft 7 in)

Sport
- Sport: Handball
- Position: Left back
- Current club: IFK Kristianstad

Youth career
- Years: Team
- –2018: Växjö HF
- 2018–2020: Redbergslids IK

Senior clubs
- Years: Team
- 2019–2022: Redbergslids IK
- 2022–2023: Industria Kielce
- 2023–2024: Ystads IF
- 2024–: IFK Kristianstad
National team
Years	Team	Apps	(Gls)
2021–	Sweden	4	(2)

Elliot Stenmalm (born 4 May 2002) is a Swedish handball player for IFK Kristianstad and the Swedish national team. He is the younger brother of fellow handball player Philip Stenmalm.

He participated at the 2021 European Men's U-19 Handball Championship.

== Achievements ==
- Polish Championship:
  - Winner: 2023
- EHF Champions League:
  - Runner-up: 2023
- IHF Super Globe:
  - Bronze medal: 2022

=== Individual awards ===
- All-Star Team as Best Left Back at the 2021 European Men’s U-19 Championship
- Top Goalscorer (61 goals) at the 2021 European Men’s U-19 Championship
- Top Goalscorer (172 goals) Handbollsligan 2021–22
