= Slovenia men's national youth handball team =

Slovenia

Information
- Association: Slovenian Handball Federation

Colours
1st	2nd

Results

IHF U-19 World Championship
- Appearances: 7 (First in 2011)
- Best result: (silver) Runners-Up : (2015)

European Youth Championship
- Appearances: 15
- Best result: (silver) Runners-Up : (2026)
- Last updated on Unknown.

The Slovenia national youth handball team is the national under-18 handball team of Slovenia. Controlled by the Slovenian Handball Federation, that is an affiliate of the International Handball Federation IHF as well as a member of the European Handball Federation EHF, The team represents Slovenia in international matches.

== Youth Olympic Games ==
Champions Runners up Third place Fourth place

Youth Olympic Games record
Year	Round	Position	GP	W	D	L	GS	GA	GD
(Singapore) 2010	Didn't Qualify								
(China) 2014	Didn't Qualify								
(Argentina) 2018	No Handball Event								
(Senegal) 2022	No Handball Event								
Total	0 / 2	0 Titles							

=== World Championship record ===
Champions Runners up Third place Fourth place

Year	Round	Position	GP	W	D*	L	GS	GA	GD
(Qatar) 2005	Didn't Qualify								
(Bahrain) 2007	Didn't Qualify								
(Tunisia) 2009	Didn't Qualify								
(Argentina) 2011		9th place							
(Hungary) 2013	Quarter-Finals	8th place							
(Russia) 2015	Final	2nd place							
(Georgia (country)) 2017		13th place							
(North Macedonia) 2019		15th place							
(Croatia) 2023		15th place							
(Egypt) 2025		13th place							
Total	7/10	0 Titles							

=== EHF European Youth Championship ===
Champions Runners up Third place Fourth place

European Youth Championship record
Year	Round	Position	GP	W	D	L	GS	GA	GD
(Switzerland) 1992	Slovenia was a part from Yugoslavia								
(Israel) 1994	Slovenia was a part from Yugoslavia								
(Estonia) 1997		5th place							
(Portugal) 1999		5th place							
(Luxembourg) 2001		7th place							
(Slovakia) 2003		5th place							
(Serbia and Montenegro) 2004	Semi-finals	4th place							
(Estonia) 2006		13th place							
(Czech Republic) 2008		9th place							
(Montenegro) 2010		8th place							
(Austria) 2012		5th place							
(Poland) 2014	Didn't Qualify								
(Croatia) 2016	Semi-finals	4th place							
(Croatia) 2018	Group stage	9th place							
(Croatia) 2021	Semi-finals	4th place							
(Montenegro) 2022	Group stage	11th place							
(Montenegro) 2024	Intermediate round	9th place							
(Serbia) 2026	Final round	Runners-up							
Total	15/18	0 Titles							
