= Germany men's national youth handball team =

Germany

Information
- Association: German Handball Association

Colours
1st	2nd

Results

IHF U-19 World Championship
- Appearances: 8 (First in 2009)
- Best result: (gold) Champions : (2025)

European Youth Championship
- Best result: (gold) Champions (2008, 2012, 2021, 2026)
- Last updated on Unknown.

The Germany national youth handball team is the national under-18 handball team of Germany. Controlled by the German Handball Association, that is an affiliate of the International Handball Federation IHF as well as a member of the European Handball Federation EHF, the team represents Germany in international matches.

== Statistics ==
=== Youth Olympic Games ===
Champions Runners up Third place Fourth place

Youth Olympic Games record
Year	Round	Position	GP	W	D	L	GS	GA	GD
(Singapore) 2010	Didn't Qualify								
(China) 2014	Didn't Qualify								
(Argentina) 2018	No Handball Event								
(Senegal) 2022	No Handball Event								
Total	0 / 2	0 Titles							

=== World Championship record ===
Champions Runners up Third place Fourth place

Year	Round	Position	GP	W	D*	L	GS	GA	GD
(Qatar) 2005	Didn't Qualify								
(Bahrain) 2007	Didn't Qualify								
(Tunisia) 2009		7th place							
(Argentina) 2011		7th place							
(Hungary) 2013	Semi-Finals	3rd place							
(Russia) 2015		17th place							
(Georgia (country)) 2017		9th place							
(North Macedonia) 2019	Final	2nd place							
(Croatia) 2023		5th place							
(Egypt) 2025	Final	Champions							
Total	8/10	1 Titles							

=== EHF European Youth Championship ===
Champions Runners up Third place Fourth place

European Youth Championship record
Year	Round	Position	GP	W	D	L	GS	GA	GD
(Switzerland) 1992		5th place							
(Israel) 1994	Didn't Qualify								
(Estonia) 1997	Didn't Qualify								
(Portugal) 1999		9th place							
(Luxembourg) 2001	Didn't Qualify								
(Slovakia) 2003	Final	Runners-Up							
(Serbia and Montenegro) 2004		5th place							
(Estonia) 2006		9th place							
(Czech Republic) 2008	Final	Champions							
(Montenegro) 2010	Semi-finals	4th place							
(Austria) 2012	Final	Champions							
(Poland) 2014	Main Round	7th place							
(Croatia) 2016	Semi-finals	Third place							
(Croatia) 2018	Main Round	6th place							
(Montenegro) 2021	Final	Champions							
(Montenegro) 2022	Semi-finals	Third place							
(Montenegro) 2024	Main Round	5th place							
(Serbia) 2026	Final	Champions							
Total	15/18	4 Titles							
