= Iceland men's national youth handball team =

Iceland

Information
- Association: Icelandic Handball Association

Colours
1st	2nd

Results

IHF U-19 World Championship
- Appearances: 6 (First in 2009)
- Best result: (silver) Runners-Up : (2009)

European Youth Championship
- Appearances: 12
- Best result: (gold) Champions : (2003)
- Last updated on Unknown.

The Iceland national youth handball team is the national under-19 handball team of Iceland. Controlled by the Icelandic Handball Association, it represents Iceland in international matches. In 2015, it finished 2nd in the 2009 Men's Youth World Handball Championship and 3rd in the 2015 Men's Youth World Handball Championship.

== Statistics ==
=== Youth Olympic Games ===
Champions Runners up Third place Fourth place

Youth Olympic Games record
Year	Round	Position	GP	W	D	L	GS	GA	GD
(Singapore) 2010	Didn't Qualify								
(China) 2014	Didn't Qualify								
(Argentina) 2018	No Handball Event								
(Senegal) 2022	No Handball Event								
Total	0 / 2	0 Titles							

=== World Championship record ===
Champions Runners up Third place Fourth place

Year	Round	Position	GP	W	D*	L	GS	GA	GD
(Qatar) 2005	Didn't Qualify								
(Bahrain) 2007	Didn't Qualify								
(Tunisia) 2009	Final	2nd place							
(Argentina) 2011	Didn't Qualify								
(Hungary) 2013	Didn't Qualify								
(Russia) 2015	Semi-Finals	3rd place							
(Georgia (country)) 2017		10th place							
(North Macedonia) 2019		8th place							
(Croatia) 2023		20th place							
(Egypt) 2025		6th place							
Total	6/10	0 Titles							

=== EHF European Youth Championship ===
Champions Runners up Third place Fourth place

European Youth Championship record
Year	Round	Position	GP	W	D	L	GS	GA	GD
(Switzerland) 1992	Didn't Qualify								
(Israel) 1994	Didn't Qualify								
(Estonia) 1997	Didn't Qualify								
(Portugal) 1999	Didn't Qualify								
(Luxembourg) 2001	Didn't Qualify								
(Slovakia) 2003	Final	Champions							
(Serbia and Montenegro) 2004		12th place							
(Estonia) 2006	Didn't Qualify								
(Czech Republic) 2008	Semi-finals	4th place							
(Montenegro) 2010		12th place							
(Austria) 2012		15th place							
(Poland) 2014		9th place							
(Croatia) 2016	Main Round	7th place							
(Croatia) 2018	Final	Runners-Up							
(Croatia) 2021	Main round	8th place							
(Montenegro) 2022	Group stage	10th place							
(Montenegro) 2024	Semi-finals	4th place							
(Serbia) 2026	Main Round	5th place							
Total	12/18	1 Title							
