= IHF Men's U19 Handball World Championship =

Men's U19 handball tournament

- Upcoming season or competition: 2025 IHF Men's U19 Handball World Championship
- Sport: Handball
- Founded: 2005
- Founder: International Handball Federation
- First season: 2005
- No. of teams: 32
- Continents: 5
- Most recent champion: Germany (1st title)
- Most titles: Denmark (3 titles)

The IHF Men's U19 Handball World Championship (or the IHF Men's Youth World Championship) is the official competition for men's national handball teams under age 19. It has been organized by the International Handball Federation since 2005. It takes place every two years in odd years.

== Tournaments ==
Year	Host country	Gold medal game			Bronze medal game		
Year	Host country	Gold	Score	Silver	Bronze	Score	Fourth place
2005; Details	Qatar	Serbia and Montenegro	39–23	South Korea	Croatia	32–31	Denmark
2007; Details	Bahrain	Denmark	27–26	Croatia	Sweden	34–27	Argentina
2009; Details	Tunisia	Croatia	40–35	Iceland	Sweden	30–27	Tunisia
2011; Details	Argentina	Denmark	24–22	Spain	Sweden	28–24	France
2013; Details	Hungary	Denmark	32–26	Croatia	Germany	29–23	Spain
2015; Details	Russia	France	33–26	Slovenia	Iceland	26–22	Spain
2017; Details	(Georgia (country)); Georgia	France	28–25	Spain	Denmark	30–29	Croatia
2019; Details	North Macedonia	Egypt	32–28	Germany	Denmark	35–27	Portugal
2021; Details	Greece	Cancelled due to the COVID-19 pandemic			Cancelled due to the COVID-19 pandemic		
2023; Details	Croatia	Spain	28–23	Denmark	Croatia	39–37	Egypt
2025; Details	Egypt	Germany	36–36 (5–4 Pen)	Spain	Denmark	33–31	Sweden
2027; Details							

== Medal table ==
Rank	Nation	Gold	Silver	Bronze	Total
1	Denmark	3	1	3	7
2	France	2	0	0	2
3	Spain	1	3	0	4
4	Croatia	1	2	2	5
5	Germany	1	1	1	3
6	Egypt	1	0	0	1
6	Serbia and Montenegro	1	0	0	1
8	Iceland	0	1	1	2
9	Slovenia	0	1	0	1
9	South Korea	0	1	0	1
11	Sweden	0	0	3	3
Totals (11 entries)		10	10	10	30

== Participating nations ==
Nation	(Qatar) 2005	(Bahrain) 2007	(Tunisia) 2009	(Argentina) 2011	(Hungary) 2013	(Russia) 2015	(Georgia (country)) 2017	(North Macedonia) 2019	(Croatia) 2023	(Egypt) 2025	2027	Years
Algeria		14th	14th			23rd	23rd		22nd	27th		6
Angola					22nd							1
Argentina	7th	4th	11th	10th	18th	21st	21st	14th	23rd	22nd	Q	11
Australia		16th										1
Austria					16th				13th	15th	Q	4
Bahrain		8th		17th			22nd	17th	29th	23rd	Q	7
Belarus					12th							1
Brazil		9th	15th	12th	9th	8th	19th	21st	14th	21st	Q	10
Burundi									32nd			1
Cameroon											Q	1
Canada								24th			Q	2
Chile				16th	24th	24th	16th	22nd	24th		Q	7
Chinese Taipei								18th				1
Croatia	3rd	2nd	1st	8th	2nd	14th	4th	10th	3rd	18th	Q	11
Czech Republic									10th	12th		2
Denmark	4th	1st	5th	1st	1st	7th	3rd	3rd	2nd	3rd	Q	11
Egypt	6th	5th	12th	5th	14th	15th	14th	1st	4th	5th	Q	11
Faroe Islands									8th	19th		2
France			9th	4th	13th	1st	1st	6th		9th	Q	8
Gabon				19th	23rd							2
Georgia							20th		26th			2
Germany			7th	7th	3rd	17th	9th	2nd	5th	1st	Q	9
Guinea										29th	Q	2
Hungary					10th	10th		5th	11th	7th	Q	6
Iceland			2nd			3rd	10th	8th	20th	6th	Q	7
Iran	8th	12th	10th						16th		Q	5
Israel											Q	1
Japan					17th	20th	8th	9th	21st	14th		6
Kosovo										24th		1
Kuwait			19th							26th		2
Libya			16th									1
Mexico							24th		30th	32nd		3
Montenegro									19th			1
Morocco	10th	15th	20th						18th	30th	Q	6
New Zealand				20th					31st			2
Nigeria								23rd				1
North Macedonia								13th	9th		Q	3
Norway			8th		5th	6th	17th	12th	7th	8th		7
Poland		6th				19th	15th				Q	4
Portugal							7th	4th	6th	17th	Q	5
Puerto Rico			17th									1
Qatar	5th	10th	13th	15th	15th	18th					Q	7
Romania					11th							1
Russia				13th		11th	6th					3
Rwanda									27th			1
Saudi Arabia								20th	12th	16th		3
Serbia				14th	7th	12th	18th	19th		10th	Q	7
Serbia and Montenegro	1st											1
Slovakia											Q	1
Slovenia				9th	8th	2nd	13th	15th	15th	13th		8
South Korea	2nd	11th		11th	21st	13th	12th		25th	25th	Q	9
Spain		7th	6th	2nd	4th	4th	2nd	7th	1st	2nd	Q	10
Sweden		3rd	3rd	3rd	6th	5th	5th	11th	17th	4th	Q	10
Switzerland				6th		9th				11th		2
Tunisia	9th	13th	4th	18th	19th	16th	11th	16th		20th	Q	10
United States									28th	31st	Q	3
Uruguay										28th		1
Venezuela			18th		20th	22nd						3
Total	10	16	20	20	24	24	24	24	32	32	32	
