= Matěj Štochl =

Czech footballer

Personal information
- Date of birth: 4 May 1989 (age 37)
- Place of birth: Hořovice, Czechoslovakia
- Height: 1.93 m (6 ft 4 in)
- Position: Centre-back

Senior career*
Years	Team	Apps	(Gls)
2008–2014	Příbram	55	(3)
2010	→ Vlašim (loan)		
2013	→ Bohemians 1905 (loan)	14	(2)
2014	→ Viktoria Žižkov (loan)	9	(1)
2017	USV Oed/Zeillern		
- * Club domestic league appearances and goals

Matěj Štochl (born 4 May 1989) is a Czech former professional footballer who played as a centre-back.
