= Denmark men's national youth handball team =

Denmark

Information
- Association: Danish Handball Federation

Colours
1st	2nd

Results

IHF U-19 World Championship
- Appearances: 10 (First in 2005)
- Best result: Winner (2007, 2011, 2013)

European Championship
- Appearances: 15 (First in 1992)
- Best result: Runner-up (2001, 2006, 2008, 2024)
- Last updated on Unknown.

Denmark men's national youth handball team
Medal record

Representing Denmark

Handball

World Youth Championship
Gold medal – first place	2007	Team
Gold medal – first place	2011	Team
Gold medal – first place	2013	Team
Silver medal – second place	2023	Team
Bronze medal – third place	2017	Team
Bronze medal – third place	2019	Team
Bronze medal – third place	2025	Team

European Youth Championship
Silver medal – second place	2001	Team
Silver medal – second place	2006	Team
Silver medal – second place	2008	Team
Silver medal – second place	2024	Team
Bronze medal – third place	1994	Team
Bronze medal – third place	1999	Team
Bronze medal – third place	2003	Team
Bronze medal – third place	2004	Team
Bronze medal – third place	2010	Team
Bronze medal – third place	2012	Team
Bronze medal – third place	2018	Team
Bronze medal – third place	2026	Team

Men's EYOF Championship
Gold medal – first place	1997	Team
Gold medal – first place	2011	Team
Silver medal – second place	2009	Team
Silver medal – second place	2022	Team
Bronze medal – third place	2019	Team

The Denmark national youth handball team is the national under–18 Handball team of Denmark. Controlled by the Danish Handball Federation it represents Denmark in international matches.

== History ==
=== Youth Olympic Games ===
Year	Round	Position	GP	W	D*	L	GS	GA	GD
Singapore 2010	Did not qualify								
China 2014	Did not qualify								
Total	1/2								

=== Youth European Olympic Games ===
Year	Round	Position	GP	W	D*	L	GS	GA	GD
Portugal 1997	Final Round	1st							
Spain 2001	Unknown								
France 2003	Unknown								
Switzerland 2005	Semi-finals	3rd							
Finland 2009	Final Round	2nd							
Turkey 2011	Final Round	1st							
Netherlands 2013	Unknown								
Total	7/7	2 Titles							

=== World Championship ===
Year	Round	Position	GP	W	D*	L	GS	GA	GD
Qatar 2005	Semifinals	4th	6	4	0	2	199	152	+47
Bahrain 2007	Final Round	1st	7	6	0	1	204	163	+41
Tunisia 2009	Quarterfinals	5th	7	5	0	2	201	180	+21
Argentina 2011	Final Round	1st	7	5	1	1	199	171	+28
Hungary 2013	Final Round	1st	9	9	0	0	311	201	+110
Georgia 2017	Semifinals	3rd	-	-	-	-	-	-	-
North Macedonia 2019	Semifinals	3rd	-	-	-	-	-	-	-
Croatia 2023	Runners-up	2nd	-	-	-	-	-	-	-
Egypt 2025	Semifinals	3rd	-	-	-	-	-	-	-
Total	10/10	3 Titles	36	29	1	6	1114	867	+247

=== European Championship ===
Year	Round	Position	GP	W	D	L	GS	GA	GD
Switzerland 1992	Did not qualify								
Israel 1994	Semi-finals	3rd							
Estonia 1997	Group stage	6th	6	3	0	3	162	141	+21
Portugal 1999	Semi-finals	3rd	7	5	0	2	176	160	+16
Luxembourg 2001	Final Round	2nd	7	4	1	2	179	170	+9
Slovakia 2003	Semi-finals	3rd	7	4	0	3	195	178	+17
Serbia and Montenegro 2004	Semi-finals	3rd	7	5	0	2	196	177	+19
Estonia 2006	Final Round	2nd	7	5	0	2	195	170	+25
Czech Republic 2008	Final Round	2nd	7	5	0	2	236	201	+35
Montenegro 2010	Semi-finals	3rd	7	5	0	2	200	186	+14
Austria 2012	Semi-finals	3rd	7	5	0	2	224	202	+22
Poland 2014	Semi-finals	4th							
Croatia 2016	Main Round	5th							
Croatia 2018	Semi-finals	3rd							
Croatia 2021	Main Round	5th							
Montenegro 2022	Main Round	6th							
Montenegro 2024	Final Round	2nd							
Serbia 2026	Semi-finals	3rd							
Total	17/18	0 Titles							
