= Hungary men's national youth handball team =

Hungary

Information
- Association: Hungarian Handball Federation

Colours
1st	2nd

Results

IHF U-19 World Championship
- Appearances: 5 (First in 2013)
- Best result: 5th place : (2019)

European Youth Championship
- Best result: (gold) Champions : (1999)
- Last updated on Unknown.

The Hungary national youth handball team is the national under-18 handball team of Hungary. Controlled by the Hungarian Handball Federation, that is an affiliate of the International Handball Federation IHF as well as a member of the European Handball Federation EHF. The team represents Hungary in international matches.

== Statistics ==
=== Youth Olympic Games ===
Champions Runners up Third place Fourth place

Youth Olympic Games record
Year	Round	Position	GP	W	D	L	GS	GA	GD
(Singapore) 2010	Didn't Qualify								
(China) 2014	Didn't Qualify								
(Argentina) 2018	No Handball Event								
(Senegal) 2022	No Handball Event								
Total	0 / 2	0 Titles							

=== World Championship record ===
Champions Runners up Third place Fourth place

Year	Round	Position	GP	W	D*	L	GS	GA	GD
(Qatar) 2005	Didn't Qualify								
(Bahrain) 2007	Didn't Qualify								
(Tunisia) 2009	Didn't Qualify								
(Argentina) 2011	Didn't Qualify								
(Hungary) 2013		10th place							
(Russia) 2015		10th place							
(Georgia (country)) 2017	Didn't Qualify								
(North Macedonia) 2019		5th place							
(Croatia) 2023		11th place							
(Egypt) 2025		7th place							
Total	5/10	0 Titles							

=== EHF European Youth Championship ===
Champions Runners up Third place Fourth place

European Youth Championship record
Year	Round	Position	GP	W	D	L	GS	GA	GD
(Switzerland) 1992	Didn't Qualify								
(Israel) 1994		Unplaced							
(Estonia) 1997	Semi-finals	Third place							
(Portugal) 1999	Final	Champions							
(Luxembourg) 2001		11th place							
(Slovakia) 2003		8th place							
(Serbia and Montenegro) 2004		10th place							
(Estonia) 2006		10th place							
(Czech Republic) 2008		12th place							
(Montenegro) 2010	Didn't Qualify								
(Austria) 2012	Didn't Qualify								
(Poland) 2014	Final	Runners-Up							
(Croatia) 2016	Didn't Qualify								
(Croatia) 2018	Intermediate Round	10th place							
(Croatia) 2021	Intermediate Round	9th place							
(Montenegro) 2022	Semi-finals	4th place							
(Montenegro) 2024	Semi-finals	Third place							
(Serbia) 2026	Main Round	6th place							
Total	14/18	1 Title							
