= Stefan Dodić =

Serbian handball player (born 2003)

Personal information
- Nationality: Serbian
- Born: 13 March 2003 (age 23) Vranje, Serbia, Serbia and Montenegro
- Height: 1.97 m (6 ft 6 in)

Sport
- Sport: Handball
- Position: Centre back
- Current club: ONE Veszprém
- Number: 44

Senior clubs
- Years: Team
- –: Metalurg II
- –2021: Metalurg Skopje
- 2019–2020: → Aerodrom
- 2021–2022: Ohrid
- 2022: Vardar 1961
- 2022–2025: Kielce
- 2022–2023: → Zagreb
- 2023: → Celje
- 2023–2025: → Vojvodina
- 2025–2026: Vojvodina
- 2026–present: Veszprém
National team
- Years: Team
- –: Serbia
Medal record
Junior European Championship
Bronze medal – third place	2022 Portugal

Stefan Dodić (born 13 March 2003) is a Serbian handball player for ONE Veszprém and the Serbian national team.

== Honors ==
RK Vardar

- Macedonian Handball Super League

- 2022

- Macedonian Handball Cup

- 2022

RK Zagreb

- Croatian Handball Premier League

- 2023

== Individual awards ==
- Most valuable player (MVP) at the 2022 European Men's U-20 Handball Championship
