= Serbia men's national youth handball team =

Serbia

Information
- Association: Serbian Handball Federation

Colours
1st	2nd

Results

IHF U-19 World Championship
- Appearances: 6 (First in 2011)
- Best result: 7th place : (2013)
- Last updated on Unknown.

The Serbia national youth handball team is the national under-18 handball team of Serbia. Controlled by the Serbian Handball Federation, that is an affiliate of the International Handball Federation IHF as well as a member of the European Handball Federation EHF, The team represents Serbia in international matches.

== Statistics ==
=== Youth Olympic Games ===
Champions Runners up Third place Fourth place

Youth Olympic Games record
Year	Round	Position	GP	W	D	L	GS	GA	GD
(Singapore) 2010	Didn't Qualify								
(China) 2014	Didn't Qualify								
(Argentina) 2018	No Handball Event								
(Senegal) 2022	No Handball Event								
Total	0 / 2	0 Titles							

=== World Championship record ===
Champions Runners up Third place Fourth place

Year	Round	Position	GP	W	D*	L	GS	GA	GD
(Qatar) 2005	Didn't Qualify								
(Bahrain) 2007	Didn't Qualify								
(Tunisia) 2009	Didn't Qualify								
(Argentina) 2011		14th place							
(Hungary) 2013	Quarter-Finals	7th place							
(Russia) 2015		12th place							
(Georgia (country)) 2017		18th place							
(North Macedonia) 2019		19th place							
(Croatia) 2023	Didn't qualify								
(Egypt) 2025		10th place							
Total	7/10	0 Titles							

=== EHF European Youth Championship ===
Champions Runners up Third place Fourth place

European Youth Championship record
Year	Round	Position	GP	W	D	L	GS	GA	GD
(Switzerland) 1992	Serbia was a part from Yugoslavia and then Serbia and Montenegro								
(Israel) 1994	Serbia was a part from Yugoslavia and then Serbia and Montenegro								
(Estonia) 1997	Serbia was a part from Yugoslavia and then Serbia and Montenegro								
(Portugal) 1999	Serbia was a part from Yugoslavia and then Serbia and Montenegro								
(Luxembourg) 2001	Serbia was a part from Yugoslavia and then Serbia and Montenegro								
(Slovakia) 2003	Serbia was a part from Yugoslavia and then Serbia and Montenegro								
(Serbia and Montenegro) 2004	Serbia was a part from Yugoslavia and then Serbia and Montenegro								
(Estonia) 2006	Serbia was a part from Yugoslavia and then Serbia and Montenegro								
(Czech Republic) 2008		10th place							
(Montenegro) 2010		5th place							
(Austria) 2012		10th place							
(Poland) 2014		13th place							
(Croatia) 2016	Main Round	8th place							
(Croatia) 2018	Main Round	8th place							
(Montenegro) 2022	Group stage	13th place							
(Montenegro) 2024	Main Round	6th place							
(Serbia) 2026	Main Round	14th place							
Total	9/17	0 Titles							
