= Handball at the European Youth Olympic Festival =

Handball has featured as a sport at the European Youth Summer Olympic Festival since its fourth edition in 1997. It has appeared on the programme at every subsequent edition of the biennial multi-sport event.

== Medal count ==
Rank	Nation	Gold	Silver	Bronze	Total
1	Denmark	5	4	6	15
2	Russia	5	2	0	7
3	Germany	4	3	2	9
4	France	4	0	1	5
5	Spain	2	1	0	3
6	Hungary	2	0	2	4
7	Slovenia	1	4	0	5
8	Croatia	1	0	3	4
9	Iceland	1	0	1	2
10	Norway	0	4	2	6
11	Romania	0	2	0	2
12	Sweden	0	1	1	2
13	Netherlands	0	1	0	1
13	Slovakia	0	1	0	1
13	Switzerland	0	1	0	1
16	Portugal	0	0	2	2
16	Serbia	0	0	2	2
18	Lithuania	0	0	1	1
18	Poland	0	0	1	1
Totals (19 entries)		25	24	24	73

== Men's tournaments ==
Year	Host Country	Gold medal game			Bronze medal game		
Year	Host Country	Gold	Score	Silver	Bronze	Score	Fourth place
1997; Details	Portugal	Denmark	–	Spain	Portugal	–	
2001; Details	Spain	Spain	28–27	Slovenia	Serbia and Montenegro	–	
2003; Details	France	Spain	–	Russia	France	–	
2009; Details	Finland	France	35–27	Denmark	Croatia	29–26	Norway
2011; Details	Turkey	Denmark	28–26 (ET)	Germany	Serbia	31–28	France
2013; Details	Netherlands	Slovenia	28–23	Norway	Sweden	33–22	Belarus
2015; Details	(Georgia (country)); Georgia	France	30–28	Slovenia	Germany	31–19	Norway
2017; Details	Hungary	Germany	29–26	Slovenia	Croatia	28–26	France
2019; Details	Azerbaijan	Croatia	29–28	Germany	Denmark	28–21	France
2022; Details	Slovakia	Germany	29–28	Denmark	Portugal	28–24	Croatia
2023; Details	Slovenia	Germany	32–27	Slovenia	Hungary	43–42	Croatia
2025; Details	North Macedonia	Iceland	28–25	Germany	Croatia	37–31	Hungary

== Women's tournaments ==
Year	Host Country	Gold medal game			Bronze medal game		
Year	Host Country	Gold	Score	Silver	Bronze	Score	Fourth place
1997; Details	Portugal	Denmark	–			–	
1999; Details	Denmark	Denmark	–	Norway	Lithuania	–	
2005; Details	Italy	Russia	23–19	Norway	Denmark	26–24	Slovenia
2007; Details	Serbia	Russia	30–26	Norway	Denmark	27–24	Serbia
2009; Details	Finland	Russia	30–24	Slovakia	Denmark	33–24	Netherlands
2011; Details	Turkey	Russia	38–20	Sweden	Denmark	26–22	Netherlands
2013; Details	Netherlands	Denmark	29–22	Russia	Germany	28–23	Netherlands
2015; Details	(Georgia (country)); Georgia	Russia	21–20 (ET)	Denmark	Norway	37–23	Czech Republic
2017; Details	Hungary	Hungary	30–23	Romania	Denmark	32–27	Russia
2019; Details	Azerbaijan	France	23–21	Netherlands	Hungary	30–20	Switzerland
2022; Details	Slovakia	Hungary	30–26	Denmark	Norway	28–23	Germany
2023; Details	Slovenia	France	32–27	Romania	Poland	26–17	Netherlands
2025; Details	North Macedonia	Germany	26–24	Switzerland	Iceland	31–26	Netherlands

== See also ==
- Athletics at the European Youth Olympic Festival
