= European Open Handball Championship =

International handball competition

The European Open Handball Championship, or Unofficial Youth Handball Championship, is a tournament hosted by European Handball Federation and Swedish Handball Federation, which takes place in Gothenburg, Sweden. It is a competition for men's U19 and women's U18.

== Men's tournaments ==
Year	Host country	Gold medal game			Bronze medal game		
Year	Host country	Gold	Score	Silver	Bronze	Score	Fourth place
2005; Details	Sweden	Germany	30–28	Russia	Sweden	34–31	Slovenia
2007; Details	Sweden	Sweden	33–23	Slovenia	Spain	32–24	Czech Republic
2009; Details	Sweden	Slovenia	29–28	Portugal	Norway	26–24	Russia
2011; Details	Sweden	Sweden	41–25	Czech Republic	Switzerland	31–20	Netherlands
2013; Details	Sweden	Sweden	31–22	Romania	Denmark	23–22	Spain
2015; Details	Sweden	Iceland	31–29	Sweden	Spain	25–22	Russia
2017; Details	Sweden	Sweden	34–22	Austria	Iceland	31–25	Norway
2019; Details	Sweden	Faroe Islands	36–29	Sweden	Iceland	30–29	Belarus

== Women's tournaments ==
Year	Host country	Gold medal game			Bronze medal game		
Year	Host country	Gold	Score	Silver	Bronze	Score	Fourth place
2006; Details	Sweden	Denmark	23–22	Russia	Norway	38–24	Romania
2008; Details	Sweden	Norway	25–17	Spain	Hungary	27–19	Sweden
2010; Details	Sweden	Denmark	24–20	Russia	Sweden	28–22	Poland
2012; Details	Sweden	Norway	26–22	Russia	Czech Republic	23–22	Germany
2014; Details	Sweden	Russia	26–22	Denmark	Norway	23–22	Czech Republic
2016; Details	Sweden	Sweden	34–33	Denmark	Norway	30–27	Netherlands
2018; Details	Sweden	Hungary	31–30	France	Romania	26–18	Switzerland
