= 2017 Men's Youth World Handball Championship =

International handball tournament held in Georgia

Tournament details
- Host country: Georgia
- Venue: 1 (in 1 host city)
- Dates: 8–20 August
- Teams: 24 (from 4 confederations)

Final positions
- Champions: France (2nd title)
- Runners-up: Spain
- Third place: Denmark
- Fourth place: Croatia

Tournament statistics
- Matches played: 92
- Goals scored: 5,231 (56.86 per match)
- Attendance: 11,094 (121 per match)
- Top scorers: (Iceland) Teitur Örn Einarsson (66 goals)

Awards
- Best player: (France) Kyllian Villeminot

The 2017 IHF Men's Youth World Championship was the seventh edition of the U-19 tournament and held in Tbilisi, Georgia from 8 to 20 August 2017. All matches were played in two halls at the Olympic Palace.

France won their second straight title by defeating Spain 28–25 in the final. Denmark captured the bronze medal after defeating Croatia 30–29.

== Qualified teams ==
Competition	Dates	Vacancies	Qualified
Host nation		1	Georgia
2016 European Men's U-18 Handball Championship	11–21 August 2016	12	Croatia; Denmark; France; Germany; Iceland; Norway; Portugal; Russia; Slovenia; Serbia; Spain; Sweden; Poland
2016 Asian Men's Youth Handball Championship	27 August–5 September 2016	3	Bahrain; Japan; South Korea
2016 African Men's Youth Handball Championship	2–9 September 2016	3	Algeria; Egypt; Tunisia
2017 Pan American Men's Youth Handball Championship	15–22 April 2017	5	Argentina; Brazil; Chile; Mexico; ~~Venezuela~~

On 31 July 2017, Venezuela withdrew from the tournament and Poland was named as the substitute.

== Draw ==
The draw was held on 10 May 2017.

=== Seedings ===
The seedings were announced on 8 May 2017.

Pot 1	Pot 2	Pot 3	Pot 4	Pot 5	Pot 6
France; Croatia; Germany; Slovenia	Denmark; Spain; Iceland; Argentina	Georgia; Serbia; Brazil; Sweden	Portugal; Chile; Bahrain; Tunisia	Russia; Venezuela; Japan; Egypt	Norway; Mexico; South Korea; Algeria

== Referees ==
The IHF selected 16 referee pairs for the championship.

Referees
Argentina	Darío Rubén Burgos / Javier Gonzalo Delgado
Belarus	Siarhei Kulik / Dzmitry Nabokau
Bahrain	Muammar Al-Watani / Mohammed Qamber
China	Cheng Yufeng / Zhou Yunlei
Croatia	Davor Lončar / Zoran Lončar
Cuba	Raymel A. Reyes Collantes / Alexys Zúñiga Rodríguez
Denmark	Karina Christiansen / Line Hansen Hesseldal
Japan	Kiyoshi Hizaki / Tomokazu Ikebuchi

Referees
Jordan	Akram Al-Zayyat / Yasser Eial Awad
Moldova	Alexei Covalciuc / Igor Covalciuc
Montenegro	Novica Mitrović / Miljan Vešović
Poland	Bartosz Leszczyński / Marcin Piechota
Russia	Dmitry Kiselev / Alexey Kiyashko
Senegal	Cheickh Mohamed Fadel Diop / Abdoulaye Faye
South Korea	Lee Eun-ha / Lee Ga-eul
Uruguay	Cristian Lemes Martines / Mathias Fabián Sosa Gordalina

== Preliminary round ==
The schedule was announced on 29 May 2017.

All times are local (UTC+4).

=== Group A ===
Pos	Team	Pld	W	D	L	GF	GA	GD	Pts	Qualification
1	France	5	5	0	0	176	124	+52	10	Round of 16
2	Egypt	5	3	1	1	150	135	+15	7	Round of 16
3	Denmark	5	2	1	2	147	144	+3	5	Round of 16
4	Sweden	5	2	0	3	122	124	−2	4	Round of 16
5	Norway	5	1	0	4	129	143	−14	2 (Note: Bahrain 23−39 Norway)	
6	Bahrain	5	1	0	4	123	177	−54	2	

Source: IHF
Rules for classification: 1) points; 2) head-to-head points; 3) head-to-head goal difference; 4) head-to-head number of goals scored; 5) goal difference.
Notes:

8 August 2017; 10:00	France	42−20	Bahrain	Tbilisi Sports Palace, Tbilisi; Attendance: 100; Referees: Covalciuc, Covalciuc (MDA)
8 August 2017; 10:00	Villeminot 8	(20−13)	Alzaimoor 6	Tbilisi Sports Palace, Tbilisi; Attendance: 100; Referees: Covalciuc, Covalciuc (MDA)
8 August 2017; 10:00	3× (yellow card) 3× (suspension)	Report	3× (yellow card) 3× (suspension)	Tbilisi Sports Palace, Tbilisi; Attendance: 100; Referees: Covalciuc, Covalciuc (MDA)

8 August 2017; 12:00	Denmark	28−28	Egypt	Tbilisi Sports Palace, Tbilisi; Attendance: 100; Referees: Lončar, Lončar (CRO)
8 August 2017; 12:00	Gidsel 8	(15−12)	Hassanein 7	Tbilisi Sports Palace, Tbilisi; Attendance: 100; Referees: Lončar, Lončar (CRO)
8 August 2017; 12:00	1× (yellow card) 4× (suspension)	Report	2× (yellow card) 5× (suspension)	Tbilisi Sports Palace, Tbilisi; Attendance: 100; Referees: Lončar, Lončar (CRO)

8 August 2017; 21:00	Sweden	23−20	Norway	Tbilisi Sports Palace, Tbilisi; Attendance: 150; Referees: Kiselev, Kiyashko (RUS)
8 August 2017; 21:00	Sunnefeldt 5	(10−11)	Hedal 6	Tbilisi Sports Palace, Tbilisi; Attendance: 150; Referees: Kiselev, Kiyashko (RUS)
8 August 2017; 21:00	2× (yellow card) 3× (suspension)	Report	2× (yellow card) 5× (suspension)	Tbilisi Sports Palace, Tbilisi; Attendance: 150; Referees: Kiselev, Kiyashko (RUS)

10 August 2017; 16:00	Bahrain	35−31	Denmark	Tbilisi Sports Palace, Tbilisi; Attendance: 100; Referees: Lee, Lee (KOR)
10 August 2017; 16:00	Fadul 11	(20−16)	Lærke 10	Tbilisi Sports Palace, Tbilisi; Attendance: 100; Referees: Lee, Lee (KOR)
10 August 2017; 16:00	3× (yellow card) 6× (suspension)	Report	3× (yellow card) 7× (suspension)	Tbilisi Sports Palace, Tbilisi; Attendance: 100; Referees: Lee, Lee (KOR)

10 August 2017; 18:00	Norway	28−34	France	Tbilisi Sports Palace, Tbilisi; Attendance: 100; Referees: Rodríguez, Collantes (CUB)
10 August 2017; 18:00	Heldal 8	(14−19)	Villeminot 10	Tbilisi Sports Palace, Tbilisi; Attendance: 100; Referees: Rodríguez, Collantes (CUB)
10 August 2017; 18:00	2× (yellow card) 4× (suspension)	Report	2× (yellow card) 3× (suspension)	Tbilisi Sports Palace, Tbilisi; Attendance: 100; Referees: Rodríguez, Collantes (CUB)

10 August 2017; 20:00	Egypt	26−24	Sweden	Tbilisi Sports Palace, Tbilisi; Attendance: 100; Referees: Leszczyński, Piechota (POL)
10 August 2017; 20:00	Rady 8	(15−10)	Svensson, Thorbjörn 7	Tbilisi Sports Palace, Tbilisi; Attendance: 100; Referees: Leszczyński, Piechota (POL)
10 August 2017; 20:00	3× (yellow card) 2× (suspension)	Report	4× (yellow card) 4× (suspension)	Tbilisi Sports Palace, Tbilisi; Attendance: 100; Referees: Leszczyński, Piechota (POL)

11 August 2017; 14:00	Bahrain	23−39	Norway	Tbilisi Sports Palace, Tbilisi; Attendance: 50; Referees: Lemes, Sosa (URU)
11 August 2017; 14:00	Fadul 7	(13−19)	Heldal 8	Tbilisi Sports Palace, Tbilisi; Attendance: 50; Referees: Lemes, Sosa (URU)
11 August 2017; 14:00	2× (yellow card) 0× (suspension)	Report	3× (yellow card) 4× (suspension) 1× (red card)	Tbilisi Sports Palace, Tbilisi; Attendance: 50; Referees: Lemes, Sosa (URU)

11 August 2017; 16:00	France	36−29	Egypt	Tbilisi Sports Palace, Tbilisi; Attendance: 100; Referees: Kiselev, Kiyashko (RUS)
11 August 2017; 16:00	Kempf 6	(15−13)	Walid Ibrahim 8	Tbilisi Sports Palace, Tbilisi; Attendance: 100; Referees: Kiselev, Kiyashko (RUS)
11 August 2017; 16:00	6× (yellow card) 3× (suspension)	Report	3× (yellow card) 3× (suspension)	Tbilisi Sports Palace, Tbilisi; Attendance: 100; Referees: Kiselev, Kiyashko (RUS)

11 August 2017; 20:00	Denmark	29−26	Sweden	Tbilisi Sports Palace, Tbilisi; Attendance: 100; Referees: Lončar, Lončar (CRO)
11 August 2017; 20:00	Gidsel 8	(14−14)	Thorbjörn 6	Tbilisi Sports Palace, Tbilisi; Attendance: 100; Referees: Lončar, Lončar (CRO)
11 August 2017; 20:00	2× (yellow card) 2× (suspension)	Report	2× (yellow card) 5× (suspension)	Tbilisi Sports Palace, Tbilisi; Attendance: 100; Referees: Lončar, Lončar (CRO)

13 August 2017; 16:00	Denmark	33−20	Norway	Tbilisi Sports Palace, Tbilisi; Attendance: 200; Referees: Kulik, Nabokau (BLR)
13 August 2017; 16:00	Jakobsen 8	(14−11)	Simonsen 5	Tbilisi Sports Palace, Tbilisi; Attendance: 200; Referees: Kulik, Nabokau (BLR)
13 August 2017; 16:00	3× (yellow card) 2× (suspension)	Report	3× (yellow card) 3× (suspension)	Tbilisi Sports Palace, Tbilisi; Attendance: 200; Referees: Kulik, Nabokau (BLR)

13 August 2017; 18:00	Sweden	21−29	France	Tbilisi Sports Palace, Tbilisi; Attendance: 319; Referees: Mitrović, Vešović (MNE)
13 August 2017; 18:00	Thorbjörn 6	(9−12)	Villeminot 6	Tbilisi Sports Palace, Tbilisi; Attendance: 319; Referees: Mitrović, Vešović (MNE)
13 August 2017; 18:00	3× (yellow card) 2× (suspension)	Report	3× (yellow card) 5× (suspension)	Tbilisi Sports Palace, Tbilisi; Attendance: 319; Referees: Mitrović, Vešović (MNE)

13 August 2017; 20:00	Egypt	37−25	Bahrain	Tbilisi Sports Palace, Tbilisi; Attendance: 150; Referees: Leszczyński, Piechota (POL)
13 August 2017; 20:00	Rady 6	(19−10)	Ali, Fadul 5	Tbilisi Sports Palace, Tbilisi; Attendance: 150; Referees: Leszczyński, Piechota (POL)
13 August 2017; 20:00	2× (yellow card) 7× (suspension)	Report	2× (yellow card) 3× (suspension)	Tbilisi Sports Palace, Tbilisi; Attendance: 150; Referees: Leszczyński, Piechota (POL)

14 August 2017; 14:00	France	35−26	Denmark	Tbilisi Sports Palace, Tbilisi; Attendance: 100; Referees: Covalciuc, Covalciuc (MDA)
14 August 2017; 14:00	Villeminot, Gibelin 6	(19−15)	Gidsel 6	Tbilisi Sports Palace, Tbilisi; Attendance: 100; Referees: Covalciuc, Covalciuc (MDA)
14 August 2017; 14:00	2× (yellow card) 4× (suspension)	Report	2× (yellow card) 3× (suspension)	Tbilisi Sports Palace, Tbilisi; Attendance: 100; Referees: Covalciuc, Covalciuc (MDA)

14 August 2017; 16:00	Norway	22−30	Egypt	Tbilisi Sports Palace, Tbilisi; Attendance: 130; Referees: Mitrović, Vešović (MNE)
14 August 2017; 16:00	Hoffstad 7	(12−14)	Abdalla 6	Tbilisi Sports Palace, Tbilisi; Attendance: 130; Referees: Mitrović, Vešović (MNE)
14 August 2017; 16:00	3× (yellow card) 5× (suspension)	Report	3× (yellow card) 5× (suspension)	Tbilisi Sports Palace, Tbilisi; Attendance: 130; Referees: Mitrović, Vešović (MNE)

14 August 2017; 20:00	Sweden	28−20	Bahrain	Tbilisi Sports Palace, Tbilisi; Attendance: 100; Referees: Lončar, Lončar (CRO)
14 August 2017; 20:00	four players 4	(13−7)	Alzaimoor 5	Tbilisi Sports Palace, Tbilisi; Attendance: 100; Referees: Lončar, Lončar (CRO)
14 August 2017; 20:00	3× (yellow card) 7× (suspension)	Report	2× (yellow card) 6× (suspension)	Tbilisi Sports Palace, Tbilisi; Attendance: 100; Referees: Lončar, Lončar (CRO)

=== Group B ===
Pos	Team	Pld	W	D	L	GF	GA	GD	Pts	Qualification
1	Iceland	5	5	0	0	160	125	+35	10	Round of 16
2	Germany	5	4	0	1	178	112	+66	8	Round of 16
3	Japan	5	3	0	2	136	130	+6	6	Round of 16
4	Chile	5	1	0	4	132	158	−26	2 (Note: Chile 2Pts, +4GD; Georgia 2Pts, −1GD; Algeria 2Pts, −3GD)	Round of 16
5	Georgia (H)	5	1	0	4	124	166	−42	2	
6	Algeria	5	1	0	4	124	163	−39	2	

Source: IHF
Rules for classification: 1) points; 2) head-to-head points; 3) head-to-head goal difference; 4) head-to-head number of goals scored; 5) goal difference.
(H) Hosts
Notes:

8 August 2017; 14:00	Iceland	26−24	Japan	Tbilisi Sports Palace, Tbilisi; Attendance: 100; Referees: Kulik, Nabokau (BLR)
8 August 2017; 14:00	Einarsson 10	(14−12)	Sueoka 6	Tbilisi Sports Palace, Tbilisi; Attendance: 100; Referees: Kulik, Nabokau (BLR)
8 August 2017; 14:00	2× (yellow card) 6× (suspension)	Report	3× (yellow card) 5× (suspension)	Tbilisi Sports Palace, Tbilisi; Attendance: 100; Referees: Kulik, Nabokau (BLR)

8 August 2017; 16:00	Germany	39−22	Chile	Tbilisi Sports Palace, Tbilisi; Referees: Alzayyat, Eial Awad (JOR)
8 August 2017; 16:00	Morante 7	(17−12)	Gomez 7	Tbilisi Sports Palace, Tbilisi; Referees: Alzayyat, Eial Awad (JOR)
8 August 2017; 16:00	2× (yellow card) 4× (suspension)	Report	1× (yellow card) 2× (suspension)	Tbilisi Sports Palace, Tbilisi; Referees: Alzayyat, Eial Awad (JOR)

8 August 2017; 19:00	Georgia	28−24	Algeria	Tbilisi Sports Palace, Tbilisi; Attendance: 700; Referees: Christiansen, Hesseldal (DEN)
8 August 2017; 19:00	Arsenashvili 9	(16−9)	Chaouche, Fodil 4	Tbilisi Sports Palace, Tbilisi; Attendance: 700; Referees: Christiansen, Hesseldal (DEN)
8 August 2017; 19:00	3× (yellow card) 4× (suspension)	Report	2× (yellow card) 10× (suspension)	Tbilisi Sports Palace, Tbilisi; Attendance: 700; Referees: Christiansen, Hesseldal (DEN)

9 August 2017; 16:00	Chile	22−27	Iceland	Tbilisi Sports Palace, Tbilisi; Attendance: 70; Referees: Zuniga, Reyes (CUB)
9 August 2017; 16:00	Gomez 5	(13−15)	Einarsson 10	Tbilisi Sports Palace, Tbilisi; Attendance: 70; Referees: Zuniga, Reyes (CUB)
9 August 2017; 16:00	1× (yellow card) 6× (suspension)	Report	2× (yellow card) 5× (suspension) 1× (red card)	Tbilisi Sports Palace, Tbilisi; Attendance: 70; Referees: Zuniga, Reyes (CUB)

9 August 2017; 18:00	Japan	30−22	Georgia	Tbilisi Sports Palace, Tbilisi; Attendance: 250; Referees: Lemes, Sosa (URU)
9 August 2017; 18:00	Sueoka 10	(14−9)	Kbilashvili, Bulbulashvili 5	Tbilisi Sports Palace, Tbilisi; Attendance: 250; Referees: Lemes, Sosa (URU)
9 August 2017; 18:00	2× (yellow card) 4× (suspension) 1× (red card)	Report	1× (yellow card) 8× (suspension)	Tbilisi Sports Palace, Tbilisi; Attendance: 250; Referees: Lemes, Sosa (URU)

9 August 2017; 20:00	Algeria	19−37	Germany	Tbilisi Sports Palace, Tbilisi; Attendance: 57; Referees: Al Watani, Qamber (BHR)
9 August 2017; 20:00	Zenadi 7	(4−17)	Ignatow 8	Tbilisi Sports Palace, Tbilisi; Attendance: 57; Referees: Al Watani, Qamber (BHR)
9 August 2017; 20:00	3× (yellow card) 3× (suspension)	Report	3× (yellow card) 2× (suspension)	Tbilisi Sports Palace, Tbilisi; Attendance: 57; Referees: Al Watani, Qamber (BHR)

11 August 2017; 10:00	Germany	34−18	Japan	Tbilisi Sports Palace, Tbilisi; Attendance: 50; Referees: Burgos, Delgado (ARG)
11 August 2017; 10:00	Ignatow 12	(22−9)	Baig, Tokuda 5	Tbilisi Sports Palace, Tbilisi; Attendance: 50; Referees: Burgos, Delgado (ARG)
11 August 2017; 10:00	1× (yellow card) 3× (suspension)	Report	1× (yellow card) 1× (suspension)	Tbilisi Sports Palace, Tbilisi; Attendance: 50; Referees: Burgos, Delgado (ARG)

11 August 2017; 12:00	Chile	32−33	Algeria	Tbilisi Sports Palace, Tbilisi; Attendance: 80; Referees: Diop, Faye (SEN)
11 August 2017; 12:00	Baumann 11	(18−17)	Houti 9	Tbilisi Sports Palace, Tbilisi; Attendance: 80; Referees: Diop, Faye (SEN)
11 August 2017; 12:00	2× (yellow card) 2× (suspension)	Report	2× (yellow card) 7× (suspension)	Tbilisi Sports Palace, Tbilisi; Attendance: 80; Referees: Diop, Faye (SEN)

11 August 2017; 18:00	Iceland	42−25	Georgia	Tbilisi Sports Palace, Tbilisi; Attendance: 100; Referees: Mitrović, Vešović (MNE)
11 August 2017; 18:00	Valdimarsson 9	(24−8)	Tkhovrebadze 5	Tbilisi Sports Palace, Tbilisi; Attendance: 100; Referees: Mitrović, Vešović (MNE)
11 August 2017; 18:00	2× (yellow card) 3× (suspension) 1× (red card)	Report	3× (yellow card) 6× (suspension)	Tbilisi Sports Palace, Tbilisi; Attendance: 100; Referees: Mitrović, Vešović (MNE)

12 August 2017; 16:00	Iceland	37−27	Algeria	Tbilisi Sports Palace, Tbilisi; Attendance: 80; Referees: Lončar, Lončar (CRO)
12 August 2017; 16:00	Einarsson 9	(15−13)	Fodil, Zenadi 7	Tbilisi Sports Palace, Tbilisi; Attendance: 80; Referees: Lončar, Lončar (CRO)
12 August 2017; 16:00	1× (yellow card) 7× (suspension)	Report	2× (yellow card) 2× (suspension)	Tbilisi Sports Palace, Tbilisi; Attendance: 80; Referees: Lončar, Lončar (CRO)

12 August 2017; 18:00	Georgia	25−41	Germany	Tbilisi Sports Palace, Tbilisi; Attendance: 150; Referees: Diop, Faye (SEN)
12 August 2017; 18:00	Rustamov, Bulbulashvili 6	(8-21)	Staar 8	Tbilisi Sports Palace, Tbilisi; Attendance: 150; Referees: Diop, Faye (SEN)
12 August 2017; 18:00	1× (yellow card) 4× (suspension) 1× (red card)	Report	1× (yellow card) 4× (suspension)	Tbilisi Sports Palace, Tbilisi; Attendance: 150; Referees: Diop, Faye (SEN)

12 August 2017; 20:00	Japan	35−27	Chile	Tbilisi Sports Palace, Tbilisi; Attendance: 50; Referees: Lemes, Sosa (URU)
12 August 2017; 20:00	Baig, Tokuda 8	(17−15)	Gomez 5	Tbilisi Sports Palace, Tbilisi; Attendance: 50; Referees: Lemes, Sosa (URU)
12 August 2017; 20:00	2× (yellow card) 3× (suspension)	Report	1× (yellow card) 3× (suspension)	Tbilisi Sports Palace, Tbilisi; Attendance: 50; Referees: Lemes, Sosa (URU)

14 August 2017; 10:00	Japan	29−21	Algeria	Tbilisi Sports Palace, Tbilisi; Attendance: 50; Referees: Al Watani, Qamber (BRN)
14 August 2017; 10:00	Tokuda 8	(17−10)	Fodil 7	Tbilisi Sports Palace, Tbilisi; Attendance: 50; Referees: Al Watani, Qamber (BRN)
14 August 2017; 10:00	2× (yellow card) 4× (suspension)	Report	2× (yellow card) 1× (suspension)	Tbilisi Sports Palace, Tbilisi; Attendance: 50; Referees: Al Watani, Qamber (BRN)

14 August 2017; 12:00	Germany	27−28	Iceland	Tbilisi Sports Palace, Tbilisi; Attendance: 100; Referees: Lee, Lee (KOR)
14 August 2017; 12:00	Ignatow, Matthes 7	(12−12)	Einarsson 10	Tbilisi Sports Palace, Tbilisi; Attendance: 100; Referees: Lee, Lee (KOR)
14 August 2017; 12:00	3× (yellow card) 6× (suspension)	Report	4× (yellow card) 7× (suspension)	Tbilisi Sports Palace, Tbilisi; Attendance: 100; Referees: Lee, Lee (KOR)

14 August 2017; 18:00	Georgia	24−29	Chile	Tbilisi Sports Palace, Tbilisi; Attendance: 300; Referees: Hizaki, Ikebuchi (JPN)
14 August 2017; 18:00	Tkhovrebadze 7	(10−18)	Baumann 10	Tbilisi Sports Palace, Tbilisi; Attendance: 300; Referees: Hizaki, Ikebuchi (JPN)
14 August 2017; 18:00	4× (yellow card) 6× (suspension)	Report	2× (yellow card) 6× (suspension)	Tbilisi Sports Palace, Tbilisi; Attendance: 300; Referees: Hizaki, Ikebuchi (JPN)

=== Group C ===
Pos	Team	Pld	W	D	L	GF	GA	GD	Pts	Qualification
1	South Korea	5	4	0	1	174	152	+22	8	Round of 16
2	Croatia	5	3	1	1	165	134	+31	7 (Note: Croatia 30−30 Portugal)	Round of 16
3	Portugal	5	3	1	1	143	131	+12	7	Round of 16
4	Poland	5	2	0	3	133	142	−9	4 (Note: Poland 29−25 Brazil)	Round of 16
5	Brazil	5	2	0	3	131	147	−16	4	
6	Argentina	5	0	0	5	113	153	−40	0	

Source: IHF
Rules for classification: 1) points; 2) head-to-head points; 3) head-to-head goal difference; 4) head-to-head number of goals scored; 5) goal difference.
Notes:

8 August 2017; 10:00	Croatia	30−30	Portugal	Tbilisi Sports Palace, Tbilisi; Attendance: 100; Referees: Hizaki, Ikebuchi (JPN)
8 August 2017; 10:00	Špruk 7	(14−16)	Monteiro 7	Tbilisi Sports Palace, Tbilisi; Attendance: 100; Referees: Hizaki, Ikebuchi (JPN)
8 August 2017; 10:00	2× (yellow card) 4× (suspension)	Report	2× (yellow card) 7× (suspension)	Tbilisi Sports Palace, Tbilisi; Attendance: 100; Referees: Hizaki, Ikebuchi (JPN)

8 August 2017; 12:00	Argentina	22−26	Poland	Tbilisi Sports Palace, Tbilisi; Attendance: 50; Referees: Diop, Faye (SEN)
8 August 2017; 12:00	Arakaki 6	(10−13)	Jarosiewicz, Mauer 6	Tbilisi Sports Palace, Tbilisi; Attendance: 50; Referees: Diop, Faye (SEN)
8 August 2017; 12:00	2× (yellow card) 2× (suspension)	Report	2× (yellow card) 3× (suspension)	Tbilisi Sports Palace, Tbilisi; Attendance: 50; Referees: Diop, Faye (SEN)

8 August 2017; 21:00	Brazil	33−35	South Korea	Tbilisi Sports Palace, Tbilisi; Attendance: 200; Referees: Al Watani, Qamber (BHR)
8 August 2017; 21:00	Pacheco 7	(18−18)	Kim R. 9	Tbilisi Sports Palace, Tbilisi; Attendance: 200; Referees: Al Watani, Qamber (BHR)
8 August 2017; 21:00	3× (yellow card) 3× (suspension)	Report	1× (yellow card) 4× (suspension)	Tbilisi Sports Palace, Tbilisi; Attendance: 200; Referees: Al Watani, Qamber (BHR)

10 August 2017; 16:00	Portugal	30−28	Argentina	Tbilisi Sports Palace, Tbilisi; Attendance: 70; Referees: Kulik, Nabokau (BLR)
10 August 2017; 16:00	Nekrushets 8	(15−13)	Canete, Aizen 5	Tbilisi Sports Palace, Tbilisi; Attendance: 70; Referees: Kulik, Nabokau (BLR)
10 August 2017; 16:00	2× (yellow card) 2× (suspension)	Report	3× (yellow card) 3× (suspension)	Tbilisi Sports Palace, Tbilisi; Attendance: 70; Referees: Kulik, Nabokau (BLR)

10 August 2017; 18:00	South Korea	33−31	Croatia	Tbilisi Sports Palace, Tbilisi; Attendance: 100; Referees: Covalciuc, Covalciuc (MDA)
10 August 2017; 18:00	Lee Y. 9	(18−15)	Bahtijarević, Vusić 9	Tbilisi Sports Palace, Tbilisi; Attendance: 100; Referees: Covalciuc, Covalciuc (MDA)
10 August 2017; 18:00	2× (yellow card) 4× (suspension)	Report	3× (yellow card) 9× (suspension)	Tbilisi Sports Palace, Tbilisi; Attendance: 100; Referees: Covalciuc, Covalciuc (MDA)

10 August 2017; 20:00	Poland	29−25	Brazil	Tbilisi Sports Palace, Tbilisi; Attendance: 50; Referees: Hizaki, Ikebuchi (JPN)
10 August 2017; 20:00	Orpik, Mauer 6	(16−8)	Moraes 6	Tbilisi Sports Palace, Tbilisi; Attendance: 50; Referees: Hizaki, Ikebuchi (JPN)
10 August 2017; 20:00	3× (yellow card) 2× (suspension)	Report	2× (yellow card) 3× (suspension)	Tbilisi Sports Palace, Tbilisi; Attendance: 50; Referees: Hizaki, Ikebuchi (JPN)

11 August 2017; 16:00	Croatia	33−28	Poland	Tbilisi Sports Palace, Tbilisi; Attendance: 100; Referees: Alzayyat, Eial Awad (JOR)
11 August 2017; 16:00	Martinović 9	(12−20)	Zarzycki, Jarosiewicz 6	Tbilisi Sports Palace, Tbilisi; Attendance: 100; Referees: Alzayyat, Eial Awad (JOR)
11 August 2017; 16:00	4× (yellow card) 6× (suspension)	Report	4× (yellow card) 3× (suspension) 1× (red card)	Tbilisi Sports Palace, Tbilisi; Attendance: 100; Referees: Alzayyat, Eial Awad (JOR)

11 August 2017; 18:00	Argentina	17−22	Brazil	Tbilisi Sports Palace, Tbilisi; Attendance: 100; Referees: Reyes, Zuniga (CUB)
11 August 2017; 18:00	three players 3	(8−7)	Moraes 8	Tbilisi Sports Palace, Tbilisi; Attendance: 100; Referees: Reyes, Zuniga (CUB)
11 August 2017; 18:00	1× (yellow card) 4× (suspension)	Report	2× (yellow card) 5× (suspension)	Tbilisi Sports Palace, Tbilisi; Attendance: 100; Referees: Reyes, Zuniga (CUB)

11 August 2017; 20:00	Portugal	33−24	South Korea	Tbilisi Sports Palace, Tbilisi; Attendance: 100; Referees: Christiansen, Hansen (DEN)
11 August 2017; 20:00	Frade, Silva 7	(16−11)	Shin 7	Tbilisi Sports Palace, Tbilisi; Attendance: 100; Referees: Christiansen, Hansen (DEN)
11 August 2017; 20:00	3× (yellow card) 7× (suspension)	Report	3× (yellow card) 2× (suspension)	Tbilisi Sports Palace, Tbilisi; Attendance: 100; Referees: Christiansen, Hansen (DEN)

13 August 2017; 16:00	Argentina	27−44	South Korea	Tbilisi Sports Palace, Tbilisi; Attendance: 50; Referees: Hizaki, Ikebuchi (JPN)
13 August 2017; 16:00	five players 3	(14−21)	Lee Y. 7	Tbilisi Sports Palace, Tbilisi; Attendance: 50; Referees: Hizaki, Ikebuchi (JPN)
13 August 2017; 16:00	2× (yellow card) 5× (suspension)	Report	1× (yellow card) 3× (suspension)	Tbilisi Sports Palace, Tbilisi; Attendance: 50; Referees: Hizaki, Ikebuchi (JPN)

13 August 2017; 18:00	Brazil	24−40	Croatia	Tbilisi Sports Palace, Tbilisi; Attendance: 100; Referees: Covalciuc, Covalciuc (MDA)
13 August 2017; 18:00	Andrade, Torriani 5	(13−18)	Martinović 11	Tbilisi Sports Palace, Tbilisi; Attendance: 100; Referees: Covalciuc, Covalciuc (MDA)
13 August 2017; 18:00	2× (yellow card) 3× (suspension)	Report	2× (yellow card) 4× (suspension)	Tbilisi Sports Palace, Tbilisi; Attendance: 100; Referees: Covalciuc, Covalciuc (MDA)

13 August 2017; 20:00	Poland	22−24	Portugal	Tbilisi Sports Palace, Tbilisi; Attendance: 50; Referees: Lemes, Sosa (URU)
13 August 2017; 20:00	three players 4	(12−14)	Frade 6	Tbilisi Sports Palace, Tbilisi; Attendance: 50; Referees: Lemes, Sosa (URU)
13 August 2017; 20:00	2× (yellow card) 3× (suspension)	Report	2× (yellow card) 6× (suspension)	Tbilisi Sports Palace, Tbilisi; Attendance: 50; Referees: Lemes, Sosa (URU)

14 August 2017; 16:00	Poland	28−38	South Korea	Tbilisi Sports Palace, Tbilisi; Attendance: 50; Referees: Burgos, Delgado (ARG)
14 August 2017; 16:00	Krysiak 6	(12−23)	Kim J.-y 8	Tbilisi Sports Palace, Tbilisi; Attendance: 50; Referees: Burgos, Delgado (ARG)
14 August 2017; 16:00	2× (yellow card) 3× (suspension)	Report	1× (yellow card)	Tbilisi Sports Palace, Tbilisi; Attendance: 50; Referees: Burgos, Delgado (ARG)

14 August 2017; 18:00	Brazil	27−26	Portugal	Tbilisi Sports Palace, Tbilisi; Attendance: 80; Referees: Kulik, Nabokau (BLR)
14 August 2017; 18:00	Andrade, Moraes 5	(14−12)	Pereira, Silva 5	Tbilisi Sports Palace, Tbilisi; Attendance: 80; Referees: Kulik, Nabokau (BLR)
14 August 2017; 18:00	2× (yellow card) 2× (suspension)	Report	1× (yellow card) 2× (suspension)	Tbilisi Sports Palace, Tbilisi; Attendance: 80; Referees: Kulik, Nabokau (BLR)

14 August 2017; 20:00	Croatia	31−19	Argentina	Tbilisi Sports Palace, Tbilisi; Attendance: 50; Referees: Alzayyat, Eial Awad (JOR)
14 August 2017; 20:00	Strbad, Bahtijarević 5	(15−8)	three players 3	Tbilisi Sports Palace, Tbilisi; Attendance: 50; Referees: Alzayyat, Eial Awad (JOR)
14 August 2017; 20:00	2× (yellow card) 4× (suspension)	Report	3× (yellow card) 1× (suspension) 1× (red card)	Tbilisi Sports Palace, Tbilisi; Attendance: 50; Referees: Alzayyat, Eial Awad (JOR)

=== Group D ===
Pos	Team	Pld	W	D	L	GF	GA	GD	Pts	Qualification
1	Spain	5	5	0	0	151	112	+39	10	Round of 16
2	Tunisia	5	4	0	1	158	129	+29	8	Round of 16
3	Slovenia	5	3	0	2	142	122	+20	6	Round of 16
4	Russia	5	2	0	3	132	127	+5	4	Round of 16
5	Serbia	5	1	0	4	131	149	−18	2	
6	Mexico	5	0	0	5	88	163	−75	0	

Source: IHF
Rules for classification: 1) points; 2) head-to-head points; 3) head-to-head goal difference; 4) head-to-head number of goals scored; 5) goal difference.

8 August 2017; 14:00	Serbia	29−18	Mexico	Tbilisi Sports Palace, Tbilisi; Attendance: 100; Referees: Lee, Lee (KOR)
8 August 2017; 14:00	Sunajko 6	(15−5)	Ortiz 6	Tbilisi Sports Palace, Tbilisi; Attendance: 100; Referees: Lee, Lee (KOR)
8 August 2017; 14:00	2× (yellow card)	Report	2× (yellow card) 4× (suspension)	Tbilisi Sports Palace, Tbilisi; Attendance: 100; Referees: Lee, Lee (KOR)

8 August 2017; 16:00	Slovenia	26−29	Tunisia	Tbilisi Sports Palace, Tbilisi; Attendance: 123; Referees: Leszczyński, Piechota (POL)
8 August 2017; 16:00	Horžen, Horvat 6	(13−15)	Darmoul 9	Tbilisi Sports Palace, Tbilisi; Attendance: 123; Referees: Leszczyński, Piechota (POL)
8 August 2017; 16:00	3× (yellow card) 4× (suspension)	Report	3× (yellow card) 7× (suspension) 1× (red card)	Tbilisi Sports Palace, Tbilisi; Attendance: 123; Referees: Leszczyński, Piechota (POL)

8 August 2017; 19:00	Spain	32−20	Russia	Tbilisi Sports Palace, Tbilisi; Attendance: 300; Referees: Mitrović, Vešović (MNE)
8 August 2017; 19:00	Tarrafeta 8	(15−7)	Kosorotov 5	Tbilisi Sports Palace, Tbilisi; Attendance: 300; Referees: Mitrović, Vešović (MNE)
8 August 2017; 19:00	2× (yellow card) 1× (suspension)	Report	3× (yellow card) 6× (suspension)	Tbilisi Sports Palace, Tbilisi; Attendance: 300; Referees: Mitrović, Vešović (MNE)

9 August 2017; 16:00	Tunisia	24−27	Spain	Tbilisi Sports Palace, Tbilisi; Attendance: 50; Referees: Lončar, Lončar (CRO)
9 August 2017; 16:00	Mustapha 11	(12−14)	Tarrafeta, Pérez 5	Tbilisi Sports Palace, Tbilisi; Attendance: 50; Referees: Lončar, Lončar (CRO)
9 August 2017; 16:00	2× (yellow card) 9× (suspension)	Report	3× (yellow card) 6× (suspension)	Tbilisi Sports Palace, Tbilisi; Attendance: 50; Referees: Lončar, Lončar (CRO)

9 August 2017; 18:00	Mexico	19−32	Slovenia	Tbilisi Sports Palace, Tbilisi; Attendance: 100; Referees: Burgos, Delgado (ARG)
9 August 2017; 18:00	Loya 9	(10−15)	Horžen, Novak 5	Tbilisi Sports Palace, Tbilisi; Attendance: 100; Referees: Burgos, Delgado (ARG)
9 August 2017; 18:00	1× (yellow card) 7× (suspension)	Report	2× (yellow card) 8× (suspension)	Tbilisi Sports Palace, Tbilisi; Attendance: 100; Referees: Burgos, Delgado (ARG)

9 August 2017; 20:00	Russia	29−24	Serbia	Tbilisi Sports Palace, Tbilisi; Attendance: 100; Referees: Christianssen, Hanssen (DEN)
9 August 2017; 20:00	Gordeev 7	(13−14)	Ivanović, Jovanović 7	Tbilisi Sports Palace, Tbilisi; Attendance: 100; Referees: Christianssen, Hanssen (DEN)
9 August 2017; 20:00	2× (yellow card) 9× (suspension)	Report	2× (yellow card) 6× (suspension)	Tbilisi Sports Palace, Tbilisi; Attendance: 100; Referees: Christianssen, Hanssen (DEN)

11 August 2017; 10:00	Slovenia	26−21	Russia	Tbilisi Sports Palace, Tbilisi; Attendance: 100; Referees: Covalciuc, Covalciuc
11 August 2017; 10:00	Novak 5	(14−9)	Kosorotov 5	Tbilisi Sports Palace, Tbilisi; Attendance: 100; Referees: Covalciuc, Covalciuc
11 August 2017; 10:00	3× (yellow card) 6× (suspension)	Report	2× (yellow card) 7× (suspension)	Tbilisi Sports Palace, Tbilisi; Attendance: 100; Referees: Covalciuc, Covalciuc

11 August 2017; 12:00	Spain	29−28	Serbia	Tbilisi Sports Palace, Tbilisi; Attendance: 150; Referees: Leszczyński, Piechota (POL)
11 August 2017; 12:00	Pérez 8	(15−14)	Sunajko 9	Tbilisi Sports Palace, Tbilisi; Attendance: 150; Referees: Leszczyński, Piechota (POL)
11 August 2017; 12:00	3× (yellow card) 2× (suspension)	Report	4× (yellow card) 3× (suspension)	Tbilisi Sports Palace, Tbilisi; Attendance: 150; Referees: Leszczyński, Piechota (POL)

11 August 2017; 14:00	Tunisia	37−19	Mexico	Tbilisi Sports Palace, Tbilisi; Attendance: 50; Referees: Al Watani, Qamber (BHR)
11 August 2017; 14:00	three players 6	(16−8)	Pesqueira 8	Tbilisi Sports Palace, Tbilisi; Attendance: 50; Referees: Al Watani, Qamber (BHR)
11 August 2017; 14:00	3× (yellow card) 4× (suspension)	Report	2× (yellow card) 4× (suspension)	Tbilisi Sports Palace, Tbilisi; Attendance: 50; Referees: Al Watani, Qamber (BHR)

12 August 2017; 16:00	Spain	33−18	Mexico	Tbilisi Sports Palace, Tbilisi; Attendance: 50; Referees: Cheng, Zhou (CHN)
12 August 2017; 16:00	Franco 7	(18−8)	loya 4	Tbilisi Sports Palace, Tbilisi; Attendance: 50; Referees: Cheng, Zhou (CHN)
12 August 2017; 16:00	2× (yellow card) 1× (suspension)	Report	1× (yellow card) 4× (suspension)	Tbilisi Sports Palace, Tbilisi; Attendance: 50; Referees: Cheng, Zhou (CHN)

12 August 2017; 18:00	Serbia	23−36	Slovenia	Tbilisi Sports Palace, Tbilisi; Attendance: 200; Referees: Kulik, Nabokau (BLR)
12 August 2017; 18:00	Milić, Jovanović 6	(10−20)	Horžen, Novak 6	Tbilisi Sports Palace, Tbilisi; Attendance: 200; Referees: Kulik, Nabokau (BLR)
12 August 2017; 18:00	3× (yellow card) 2× (suspension)	Report	2× (yellow card) 3× (suspension)	Tbilisi Sports Palace, Tbilisi; Attendance: 200; Referees: Kulik, Nabokau (BLR)

12 August 2017; 20:00	Russia	30−31	Tunisia	Tbilisi Sports Palace, Tbilisi; Attendance: 250; Referees: Mitrović, Vešović (MNE)
12 August 2017; 20:00	Gordeev 8	(16−14)	Darmoul 12	Tbilisi Sports Palace, Tbilisi; Attendance: 250; Referees: Mitrović, Vešović (MNE)
12 August 2017; 20:00	2× (yellow card) 8× (suspension) 1× (red card)	Report	2× (yellow card) 7× (suspension)	Tbilisi Sports Palace, Tbilisi; Attendance: 250; Referees: Mitrović, Vešović (MNE)

14 August 2017; 10:00	Russia	32−14	Mexico	Tbilisi Sports Palace, Tbilisi; Attendance: 50; Referees: Reyes, Zuniga (CUB)
14 August 2017; 10:00	Gumarov 12	(15−7)	Martinez 5	Tbilisi Sports Palace, Tbilisi; Attendance: 50; Referees: Reyes, Zuniga (CUB)
14 August 2017; 10:00	2× (yellow card) 6× (suspension)	Report	2× (yellow card) 2× (suspension)	Tbilisi Sports Palace, Tbilisi; Attendance: 50; Referees: Reyes, Zuniga (CUB)

14 August 2017; 12:00	Serbia	27−37	Tunisia	Tbilisi Sports Palace, Tbilisi; Attendance: 50; Referees: Diop, Faye (SEN)
14 August 2017; 12:00	Sunajko 9	(14−16)	Darmoul 10	Tbilisi Sports Palace, Tbilisi; Attendance: 50; Referees: Diop, Faye (SEN)
14 August 2017; 12:00	2× (yellow card) 4× (suspension)	Report	2× (yellow card) 3× (suspension)	Tbilisi Sports Palace, Tbilisi; Attendance: 50; Referees: Diop, Faye (SEN)

14 August 2017; 14:00	Slovenia	22−30	Spain	Tbilisi Sports Palace, Tbilisi; Attendance: 70; Referees: Christianssen, Hanssen (DEN)
14 August 2017; 14:00	Makuc 5	(10−17)	Pérez 6	Tbilisi Sports Palace, Tbilisi; Attendance: 70; Referees: Christianssen, Hanssen (DEN)
14 August 2017; 14:00	4× (yellow card) 7× (suspension)	Report	1× (yellow card) 5× (suspension)	Tbilisi Sports Palace, Tbilisi; Attendance: 70; Referees: Christianssen, Hanssen (DEN)

== President's Cup ==
17th place bracket

17th–20th place semifinals
16 August
Norway	39
Georgia	21
16 August
Brazil	26
Serbia	27

17th place
17 August
Norway	32
Serbia	23
19th place
17 August
Georgia	23
Brazil	32

21st place bracket

21st–24th place semifinals
16 August
Bahrain (Pen.)	42
Algeria	40
16 August
Argentina	32
Mexico	20

21st place
17 August
Bahrain	24
Argentina	25
23rd place
17 August
Algeria	27
Mexico	25

=== 21st–24th place semifinals ===
16 August 2017
09:30
Bahrain
42–40
Algeria
Tbilisi Sports Palace, Tbilisi
Attendance: 50
Referees: Reyes, Zuniga (CUB)
Fadul 16
(24–19)
Gasmi, Fodil 9
1× (yellow card) 5× (suspension)
Report
1× (yellow card) 9× (suspension)

FT: 37–37 Pen: 5–3

16 August 2017; 09:30	Argentina	32–20	Mexico	Tbilisi Sports Palace, Tbilisi; Attendance: 50; Referees: Cheng, Zhou (CHN)
16 August 2017; 09:30	Ceccardi 6	(15–9)	Ortiz 5	Tbilisi Sports Palace, Tbilisi; Attendance: 50; Referees: Cheng, Zhou (CHN)
16 August 2017; 09:30	3× (yellow card) 2× (suspension)	Report	2× (yellow card) 2× (suspension)	Tbilisi Sports Palace, Tbilisi; Attendance: 50; Referees: Cheng, Zhou (CHN)

=== 17th–20th place semifinals ===
16 August 2017; 11:45	Norway	39–21	Georgia	Tbilisi Sports Palace, Tbilisi; Attendance: 50; Referees: Lee, Lee (KOR)
16 August 2017; 11:45	Hoffstad 11	(17–12)	Tielidze 6	Tbilisi Sports Palace, Tbilisi; Attendance: 50; Referees: Lee, Lee (KOR)
16 August 2017; 11:45	3× (yellow card) 4× (suspension)	Report	2× (yellow card) 1× (suspension)	Tbilisi Sports Palace, Tbilisi; Attendance: 50; Referees: Lee, Lee (KOR)

16 August 2017; 11:45	Brazil	26–27	Serbia	Tbilisi Sports Palace, Tbilisi; Attendance: 100; Referees: Alzayyat, Eial Awad (JOR)
16 August 2017; 11:45	Monte, Torriani 7	(13–13)	Jovanović 9	Tbilisi Sports Palace, Tbilisi; Attendance: 100; Referees: Alzayyat, Eial Awad (JOR)
16 August 2017; 11:45	4× (yellow card) 5× (suspension)	Report	3× (yellow card) 2× (suspension)	Tbilisi Sports Palace, Tbilisi; Attendance: 100; Referees: Alzayyat, Eial Awad (JOR)

=== 23rd place game ===
17 August 2017; 09:30	Algeria	27–25	Mexico	Tbilisi Sports Palace, Tbilisi; Attendance: 50; Referees: Lee, Lee (KOR)
17 August 2017; 09:30	Fodil 8	(10–9)	Loya 14	Tbilisi Sports Palace, Tbilisi; Attendance: 50; Referees: Lee, Lee (KOR)
17 August 2017; 09:30	3× (yellow card) 6× (suspension)	Report	2× (yellow card) 1× (suspension)	Tbilisi Sports Palace, Tbilisi; Attendance: 50; Referees: Lee, Lee (KOR)

=== 21st place game ===
17 August 2017; 11:45	Bahrain	24–25	Argentina	Tbilisi Sports Palace, Tbilisi; Attendance: 100; Referees: Hizaki, Ikebuchi (JPN)
17 August 2017; 11:45	Fadul 11	(14–12)	Palacios 8	Tbilisi Sports Palace, Tbilisi; Attendance: 100; Referees: Hizaki, Ikebuchi (JPN)
17 August 2017; 11:45	1× (yellow card) 2× (suspension)	Report	3× (yellow card) 6× (suspension) 1× (red card)	Tbilisi Sports Palace, Tbilisi; Attendance: 100; Referees: Hizaki, Ikebuchi (JPN)

=== 19th place game ===
17 August 2017; 09:30	Georgia	23–32	Brazil	Tbilisi Sports Palace, Tbilisi; Attendance: 100; Referees: Cheng, Zhou (CHN)
17 August 2017; 09:30	Lapiashvili 7	(14–16)	Freitas 12	Tbilisi Sports Palace, Tbilisi; Attendance: 100; Referees: Cheng, Zhou (CHN)
17 August 2017; 09:30	1× (yellow card) 6× (suspension)	Report	2× (yellow card) 3× (suspension)	Tbilisi Sports Palace, Tbilisi; Attendance: 100; Referees: Cheng, Zhou (CHN)

=== 17th place game ===
17 August 2017; 11:45	Norway	30–25	Serbia	Tbilisi Sports Palace, Tbilisi; Attendance: 50; Referees: Kiselev, Kiyashko (RUS)
17 August 2017; 11:45	Haugseng, Hoffstad 7	(17–12)	Jovanovic	Tbilisi Sports Palace, Tbilisi; Attendance: 50; Referees: Kiselev, Kiyashko (RUS)
17 August 2017; 11:45	3× (yellow card) 4× (suspension)	Report	2× (yellow card) 3× (suspension)	Tbilisi Sports Palace, Tbilisi; Attendance: 50; Referees: Kiselev, Kiyashko (RUS)

== 9–16th placement games ==
The eight losers of the round of 16 are seeded according to their results in the preliminary round against teams ranked 1–4 and play an elimination game to determine their final position.

Pos	Team	Pld	W	D	L	GF	GA	GD	Pts
1	Iceland	3	3	0	0	81	73	+8	6
2	Germany	3	2	0	1	100	68	+32	4
3	South Korea	3	2	0	1	95	92	+3	4
4	Tunisia	3	2	0	1	84	83	+1	4
5	Egypt	3	1	1	1	83	88	−5	3
6	Slovenia	3	1	0	2	74	80	−6	2
7	Poland	3	0	0	3	78	95	−17	0
8	Chile	3	0	0	3	71	101	−30	0

Rules for classification: 1) points; 2) goal difference; 3) number of goals scored.

=== 15th place game ===
17 August 2017; 14:00	Poland	34−30	Chile	Tbilisi Sports Palace, Tbilisi; Attendance: 100; Referees: Lemes, Sosa (URU)
17 August 2017; 14:00	Dudkowski 8	(15−17)	Codina 8	Tbilisi Sports Palace, Tbilisi; Attendance: 100; Referees: Lemes, Sosa (URU)
17 August 2017; 14:00	1× (yellow card) 2× (suspension)	Report	2× (yellow card) 3× (suspension)	Tbilisi Sports Palace, Tbilisi; Attendance: 100; Referees: Lemes, Sosa (URU)

=== 13th place game ===
17 August 2017; 16:15	Egypt	30−35	Slovenia	Tbilisi Sports Palace, Tbilisi; Attendance: 100; Referees: Kulik, Nabokau (BLR)
17 August 2017; 16:15	Khaled Hassanein, Sami Ahmed Ali 7	(15−18)	Rozman 9	Tbilisi Sports Palace, Tbilisi; Attendance: 100; Referees: Kulik, Nabokau (BLR)
17 August 2017; 16:15	1× (yellow card) 3× (suspension)	Report	2× (yellow card) 2× (suspension)	Tbilisi Sports Palace, Tbilisi; Attendance: 100; Referees: Kulik, Nabokau (BLR)

=== Eleventh place game ===
17 August 2017; 14:00	South Korea	34−36	Tunisia	Tbilisi Sports Palace, Tbilisi; Attendance: 85; Referees: Alzayyat, Eial Awad (JOR)
17 August 2017; 14:00	three players 6	(17−17)	Abid 8	Tbilisi Sports Palace, Tbilisi; Attendance: 85; Referees: Alzayyat, Eial Awad (JOR)
17 August 2017; 14:00	4× (yellow card) 2× (suspension)	Report	4× (yellow card) 11× (suspension)	Tbilisi Sports Palace, Tbilisi; Attendance: 85; Referees: Alzayyat, Eial Awad (JOR)

=== Ninth place game ===
17 August 2017; 16:15	Iceland	26−37	Germany	Tbilisi Sports Palace, Tbilisi; Attendance: 80; Referees: Al Watani, Qamber (BHR)
17 August 2017; 16:15	Einarsson 6	(14−21)	Klein, Morante Maldonado 8	Tbilisi Sports Palace, Tbilisi; Attendance: 80; Referees: Al Watani, Qamber (BHR)
17 August 2017; 16:15	3× (yellow card) 6× (suspension)	Report	3× (yellow card) 6× (suspension)	Tbilisi Sports Palace, Tbilisi; Attendance: 80; Referees: Al Watani, Qamber (BHR)

== Knockout stage ==
=== Bracket ===
Round of 16
16 August
Iceland	26
Sweden	31
16 August
Slovenia	25
Croatia	29
16 August
Japan	31
Egypt	30
16 August
Spain	27
Poland	23
16 August
France	43
Chile	21
16 August
Portugal	34
Tunisia	25
16 August
Denmark	28
Germany	24
16 August
South Korea	31
Russia	32

Quarterfinals
17 August
Sweden	25
Croatia (OT)	27
17 August
Japan	27
Spain	32
17 August
France	34
Portugal	24
17 August
Denmark	37
Russia	28

Semifinals
19 August
Croatia	24
Spain	26
19 August
France	35
Denmark	27

Final
20 August
Spain	25
France	28
Third place
20 August
Croatia	29
Denmark	30

5th place bracket

5th–8th place Semifinals
19 August
Sweden	34
Japan	28
19 August
Portugal	26
Russia	33

Fifth place
20 August
Sweden	26
Russia	25
Seventh place
20 August
Japan	24
Portugal	33

=== Round of 16 ===
16 August 2017; 14:00	Iceland	26–31	Sweden	Tbilisi Sports Palace, Tbilisi; Attendance: 200; Referees: Kulik, Nabokau (BLR)
16 August 2017; 14:00	Einarsson 14	(11–14)	Sunnefeldt 8	Tbilisi Sports Palace, Tbilisi; Attendance: 200; Referees: Kulik, Nabokau (BLR)
16 August 2017; 14:00	1× (yellow card) 3× (suspension)	Report	3× (yellow card) 5× (suspension)	Tbilisi Sports Palace, Tbilisi; Attendance: 200; Referees: Kulik, Nabokau (BLR)

16 August 2017; 14:00	Portugal	34–25	Tunisia	Tbilisi Sports Palace, Tbilisi; Attendance: 50; Referees: Kiselev, Kiyashko (RUS)
16 August 2017; 14:00	Frade 8	(17–14)	Mustapha 8	Tbilisi Sports Palace, Tbilisi; Attendance: 50; Referees: Kiselev, Kiyashko (RUS)
16 August 2017; 14:00	3× (yellow card) 5× (suspension)	Report	1× (yellow card) 4× (suspension)	Tbilisi Sports Palace, Tbilisi; Attendance: 50; Referees: Kiselev, Kiyashko (RUS)

16 August 2017; 16:15	Slovenia	25–29	Croatia	Tbilisi Sports Palace, Tbilisi; Attendance: 100; Referees: Leszczyński, Piechota (POL)
16 August 2017; 16:15	Horžen, Rozman 5	(14–17)	Martinović 11	Tbilisi Sports Palace, Tbilisi; Attendance: 100; Referees: Leszczyński, Piechota (POL)
16 August 2017; 16:15	2× (yellow card) 3× (suspension)	Report	5× (yellow card) 4× (suspension)	Tbilisi Sports Palace, Tbilisi; Attendance: 100; Referees: Leszczyński, Piechota (POL)

16 August 2017; 16:15	France	43–21	Chile	Tbilisi Sports Palace, Tbilisi; Attendance: 50; Referees: Diop, Faye (SEN)
16 August 2017; 16:15	Kempf 8	(22–13)	Gomez 6	Tbilisi Sports Palace, Tbilisi; Attendance: 50; Referees: Diop, Faye (SEN)
16 August 2017; 16:15	2× (yellow card) 4× (suspension)	Report	1× (yellow card) 4× (suspension)	Tbilisi Sports Palace, Tbilisi; Attendance: 50; Referees: Diop, Faye (SEN)

16 August 2017; 18:30	Japan	31–30	Egypt	Tbilisi Sports Palace, Tbilisi; Attendance: 200; Referees: Burgos, Delgado (ARG)
16 August 2017; 18:30	Tokuda 9	(10–14)	Khaled Hassanein 7	Tbilisi Sports Palace, Tbilisi; Attendance: 200; Referees: Burgos, Delgado (ARG)
16 August 2017; 18:30	2× (yellow card) 4× (suspension)	Report	1× (yellow card) 7× (suspension) 1× (red card)	Tbilisi Sports Palace, Tbilisi; Attendance: 200; Referees: Burgos, Delgado (ARG)

16 August 2017; 18:30	Denmark	28–24	Germany	Tbilisi Sports Palace, Tbilisi; Attendance: 200; Referees: Lončar, Lončar (CRO)
16 August 2017; 18:30	Lærke 12	(12–11)	Ignatow 5	Tbilisi Sports Palace, Tbilisi; Attendance: 200; Referees: Lončar, Lončar (CRO)
16 August 2017; 18:30	2× (yellow card) 4× (suspension)	Report	4× (yellow card) 6× (suspension)	Tbilisi Sports Palace, Tbilisi; Attendance: 200; Referees: Lončar, Lončar (CRO)

16 August 2017; 20:45	Spain	27–23	Poland	Tbilisi Sports Palace, Tbilisi; Attendance: 50; Referees: Lemes, Sosa (URU)
16 August 2017; 20:45	Cabello Palma 5	(15–11)	Mauer 5	Tbilisi Sports Palace, Tbilisi; Attendance: 50; Referees: Lemes, Sosa (URU)
16 August 2017; 20:45	2× (yellow card) 2× (suspension)	Report	1× (yellow card) 3× (suspension)	Tbilisi Sports Palace, Tbilisi; Attendance: 50; Referees: Lemes, Sosa (URU)

16 August 2017; 20:45	South Korea	31–32	Russia	Tbilisi Sports Palace, Tbilisi; Attendance: 50; Referees: Al Watani, Qamber (BHR)
16 August 2017; 20:45	Park 7	(18–14)	Kosorotov 15	Tbilisi Sports Palace, Tbilisi; Attendance: 50; Referees: Al Watani, Qamber (BHR)
16 August 2017; 20:45	4× (yellow card) 3× (suspension)	Report	3× (yellow card) 11× (suspension)	Tbilisi Sports Palace, Tbilisi; Attendance: 50; Referees: Al Watani, Qamber (BHR)

=== Quarterfinals ===
17 August 2017
18:30
Sweden
25–27 (ET)
Croatia
Tbilisi Sports Palace, Tbilisi
Attendance: 150
Referees: Mitrović, Vešović (MNE)
Sunnefeldt 6
(12–9)
Jaganjac, Martinović 7
3× (yellow card) 2× (suspension)
Report
2× (yellow card) 6× (suspension)

FT: 23–23 ET: 2–4

17 August 2017; 18:30	Portugal	24–34	France	Tbilisi Sports Palace, Tbilisi; Attendance: 300; Referees: Lončar, Lončar (CRO)
17 August 2017; 18:30	Frade, Pereira 5	(12–16)	Villeminot 6	Tbilisi Sports Palace, Tbilisi; Attendance: 300; Referees: Lončar, Lončar (CRO)
17 August 2017; 18:30	3× (yellow card) 4× (suspension)	Report	3× (yellow card) 4× (suspension)	Tbilisi Sports Palace, Tbilisi; Attendance: 300; Referees: Lončar, Lončar (CRO)

17 August 2017; 20:45	Japan	27–32	Spain	Tbilisi Sports Palace, Tbilisi; Referees: Christianssen, Hanssen
17 August 2017; 20:45	Tokuda 7	(12–15)	Navarro, Valera 5	Tbilisi Sports Palace, Tbilisi; Referees: Christianssen, Hanssen
17 August 2017; 20:45	3× (yellow card) 4× (suspension)	Report	2× (yellow card) 2× (suspension)	Tbilisi Sports Palace, Tbilisi; Referees: Christianssen, Hanssen

17 August 2017; 20:45	Denmark	37–28	Russia	Tbilisi Sports Palace, Tbilisi; Attendance: 100; Referees: Leszczyński, Piechota (POL)
17 August 2017; 20:45	Jakobsen 9	(21–15)	Kamenev 8	Tbilisi Sports Palace, Tbilisi; Attendance: 100; Referees: Leszczyński, Piechota (POL)
17 August 2017; 20:45	2× (yellow card) 2× (suspension)	Report	2× (yellow card) 5× (suspension) 1× (red card)	Tbilisi Sports Palace, Tbilisi; Attendance: 100; Referees: Leszczyński, Piechota (POL)

=== 5th–8th place semifinals ===
19 August 2017; 12:30	Sweden	34–28	Japan	Tbilisi Sports Palace, Tbilisi; Attendance: 50; Referees: Al-Watani, Qamber (BHR)
19 August 2017; 12:30	Sunnefeldt, Thorbjörn 6	(17–10)	three players 3	Tbilisi Sports Palace, Tbilisi; Attendance: 50; Referees: Al-Watani, Qamber (BHR)
19 August 2017; 12:30	2× (yellow card) 5× (suspension)	Report	3× (yellow card) 2× (suspension)	Tbilisi Sports Palace, Tbilisi; Attendance: 50; Referees: Al-Watani, Qamber (BHR)

19 August 2017; 15:00	Portugal	26–33	Russia	Tbilisi Sports Palace, Tbilisi; Attendance: 150; Referees: Lemes, Sosa (URU)
19 August 2017; 15:00	D. Silva 9	(12–14)	Nikolaenkov 12	Tbilisi Sports Palace, Tbilisi; Attendance: 150; Referees: Lemes, Sosa (URU)
19 August 2017; 15:00	2× (yellow card) 3× (suspension)	Report	2× (yellow card) 5× (suspension)	Tbilisi Sports Palace, Tbilisi; Attendance: 150; Referees: Lemes, Sosa (URU)

=== Semifinals ===
19 August 2017; 17:30	Croatia	24–26	Spain	Tbilisi Sports Palace, Tbilisi; Attendance: 300; Referees: Leszczyński, Piechota (POL)
19 August 2017; 17:30	Raguž 7	(12–13)	Pérez Arce 5	Tbilisi Sports Palace, Tbilisi; Attendance: 300; Referees: Leszczyński, Piechota (POL)
19 August 2017; 17:30	2× (yellow card) 3× (suspension)	Report	2× (yellow card) 2× (suspension)	Tbilisi Sports Palace, Tbilisi; Attendance: 300; Referees: Leszczyński, Piechota (POL)

19 August 2017; 20:00	France	35–27	Denmark	Tbilisi Sports Palace, Tbilisi; Attendance: 300; Referees: Kulik, Nabokau (BLR)
19 August 2017; 20:00	Gibelin, Kempf 5	(17–12)	Lærke 8	Tbilisi Sports Palace, Tbilisi; Attendance: 300; Referees: Kulik, Nabokau (BLR)
19 August 2017; 20:00	1× (yellow card) 3× (suspension)	Report	3× (yellow card) 3× (suspension)	Tbilisi Sports Palace, Tbilisi; Attendance: 300; Referees: Kulik, Nabokau (BLR)

=== Seventh place game ===
20 August 2017; 10:30	Japan	26−34	Portugal	Tbilisi Sports Palace, Tbilisi; Attendance: 50; Referees: Kiselev, Kiyashko (RUS)
20 August 2017; 10:30	Sueoka 9	(13−14)	D. Silva 11	Tbilisi Sports Palace, Tbilisi; Attendance: 50; Referees: Kiselev, Kiyashko (RUS)
20 August 2017; 10:30	2× (yellow card) 3× (suspension)	Report	3× (yellow card) 4× (suspension)	Tbilisi Sports Palace, Tbilisi; Attendance: 50; Referees: Kiselev, Kiyashko (RUS)

=== Fifth place game ===
20 August 2017; 13:00	Sweden	26−25	Russia	Tbilisi Sports Palace, Tbilisi; Attendance: 50; Referees: Loncar, Loncar (CRO)
20 August 2017; 13:00	Sunnefeldt 9	(13−9)	Nikolaenkov 8	Tbilisi Sports Palace, Tbilisi; Attendance: 50; Referees: Loncar, Loncar (CRO)
20 August 2017; 13:00	1× (yellow card) 3× (suspension)	Report	1× (yellow card) 4× (suspension)	Tbilisi Sports Palace, Tbilisi; Attendance: 50; Referees: Loncar, Loncar (CRO)

=== Third place game ===
20 August 2017; 15:30	Croatia	29−30	Denmark	Tbilisi Sports Palace, Tbilisi; Attendance: 300; Referees: Al Watani, Qamber (BHR)
20 August 2017; 15:30	Lucin, Jaganjac 7	(16−17)	Vinther 8	Tbilisi Sports Palace, Tbilisi; Attendance: 300; Referees: Al Watani, Qamber (BHR)
20 August 2017; 15:30	4× (yellow card) 5× (suspension)	Report	3× (yellow card) 4× (suspension)	Tbilisi Sports Palace, Tbilisi; Attendance: 300; Referees: Al Watani, Qamber (BHR)

=== Final ===
20 August 2017; 18:00	Spain	25−28	France	Tbilisi Sports Palace, Tbilisi; Attendance: 500; Referees: Mitrovic, Vesovic (MNE)
20 August 2017; 18:00	Valera 8	(13−12)	Villeminot 13	Tbilisi Sports Palace, Tbilisi; Attendance: 500; Referees: Mitrovic, Vesovic (MNE)
20 August 2017; 18:00	3× (yellow card) 4× (suspension)	Report	4× (yellow card) 3× (suspension)	Tbilisi Sports Palace, Tbilisi; Attendance: 500; Referees: Mitrovic, Vesovic (MNE)

== Final ranking ==
Rank	Team
Gold medal	France
Silver medal	Spain
Bronze medal	Denmark
4	Croatia
5	Sweden
6	Russia
7	Portugal
8	Japan
9	Germany
10	Iceland
11	Tunisia
12	South Korea
13	Slovenia
14	Egypt
15	Poland
16	Chile
17	Norway
18	Serbia
19	Brazil
20	Georgia
21	Argentina
22	Bahrain
23	Algeria
24	Mexico

== Statistics ==
=== Top goalscorers ===
Rank	Name	Team	Goals	Shots	%
1	Teitur Örn Einarsson	Iceland	66	108	61.1
2	Kyllian Villeminot	France	60	87	69.0
3	Emil Lærke	Denmark	58	109	53.2
4	Ahmed Fadul	Bahrain	55	81	67.9
5	Rennosuke Tokuda	Japan	53	95	55.8
6	Ivan Martinović	Croatia	52	80	65.0
7	Diogo Silva	Portugal	52	88	59.1
8	Sergei Kosorotov	Russia	49	72	68.1
9	Oskar Sunnefeldt	Sweden	48	80	60.0
10	Emil Jakobsen	Denmark	46	61	75.4

Source: IHF

=== Top goalkeepers ===
Rank	Name	Team	%	Saves	Shots
1	Diogo Valerio	Portugal	30.9	93	301
2	Maksim Popov	Russia	35.0	91	260
3	Ivan Panjan	Croatia	32.2	87	270
4	Todor Jandrić	Serbia	36.7	76	207
5	Valentin Kieffer	France	34.3	74	216
6	Hikaru Nakamura	Japan	35.1	71	202
7	Marek Bartosik	Poland	31.0	70	226
8	Abdelrhman Taha	Egypt	34.7	69	199
9	Gašper Dobaj	Slovenia	31.2	68	218
10	Vicente González	Chile	26.6	68	256

Source: IHF

== Awards ==
=== MVP ===
- Left-back: (France) Kyllian Villeminot

=== All-star team ===
- Goalkeeper: (Russia) Maksim Popov
- Right wing: (France) Edouard Kempf
- Right back: (Croatia) Ivan Martinović
- Centre back: (Spain) Ian Tarrafeta
- Left back: (Denmark) Emil Lærke
- Left wing: (Denmark) Emil Jakobsen
- Pivot: (Portugal) Luis Frade
