= Russia men's national youth handball team =

Russia

Information
- Association: Russian Handball Federation

Colours
| 1st | 2nd |

Results

IHF U-19 World Championship
- Appearances: 3 (First in 2011)
- Best result: 6th place (2017)

European Youth Championship
- Best result: (gold) Champions (2001)
- Last updated on Unknown.

The Russia national youth handball team is the national under–18 handball team of Russia. Controlled by the Russian Handball Federation, that is an affiliate of the International Handball Federation IHF as well as a member of the European Handball Federation EHF, The team represented Russia in international matches.

In reaction to the 2022 Russian invasion of Ukraine, the International Handball Federation banned Russian and Belarus athletes and officials, and the European Handball Federation suspended the national teams of Russia and Belarus as well as Russian and Belarusian clubs competing in European handball competitions. Referees, officials, and commission members from Russia and Belarus will not be called upon for future activities. And new organisers will be sought for the YAC 16 EHF Beach Handball EURO and the Qualifier Tournaments for the Beach Handball EURO 2023, which were to be held in Moscow.

== Statistics ==
=== Youth Olympic Games ===
Champions Runners up Third place Fourth place

Youth Olympic Games record
| Year | Round | Position | GP | W | D | L | GS | GA | GD |
|---|---|---|---|---|---|---|---|---|---|
| (Singapore) 2010 | Didn't qualify | | | | | | | | |
| (China) 2014 | Didn't qualify | | | | | | | | |
| (Argentina) 2018 | No handball event | | | | | | | | |
| (Senegal) 2022 | No handball event | | | | | | | | |
| Total | 0 / 4 | 0 Titles | | | | | | | |

=== World Championship record ===
Champions Runners up Third place Fourth place

| Year | Round | Position | GP | W | D* | L | GS | GA | GD |
|---|---|---|---|---|---|---|---|---|---|
| (Qatar) 2005 | Didn't qualify | | | | | | | | |
| (Bahrain) 2007 | Didn't qualify | | | | | | | | |
| (Tunisia) 2009 | Didn't qualify | | | | | | | | |
| (Argentina) 2011 | | 13th place | | | | | | | |
| (Hungary) 2013 | Didn't qualify | | | | | | | | |
| (Russia) 2015 | | 11th place | | | | | | | |
| (Georgia (country)) 2017 | Quarter-Finals | 6th place | | | | | | | |
| (North Macedonia) 2019 | Didn't qualify | | | | | | | | |
| (Greece) 2021 | Cancelled due to COVID-19 pandemic | | | | | | | | |
| (Croatia) 2023 | Suspended | | | | | | | | |
| (Egypt) 2025 | Suspended | | | | | | | | |
| Total | 3/10 | 0 Titles | | | | | | | |

=== EHF European Youth Championship ===
Champions Runners up Third place Fourth place

European Youth Championship record
| Year | Round | Position | GP | W | D | L | GS | GA | GD |
|---|---|---|---|---|---|---|---|---|---|
| (Switzerland) 1992 | Final | Runners-Up | | | | | | | |
| (Israel) 1994 | | Unplaced | | | | | | | |
| (Estonia) 1997 | Didn't qualify | | | | | | | | |
| (Portugal) 1999 | Semi-finals | 4th place | | | | | | | |
| (Luxembourg) 2001 | Final | Champions | | | | | | | |
| (Slovakia) 2003 | | 12th place | | | | | | | |
| (Serbia and Montenegro) 2004 | | 11th place | | | | | | | |
| (Estonia) 2006 | | 16th place | | | | | | | |
| (Czech Republic) 2008 | | 14th place | | | | | | | |
| (Montenegro) 2010 | | 9th place | | | | | | | |
| (Austria) 2012 | Didn't qualify | | | | | | | | |
| (Poland) 2014 | Intermediate round | 12th place | | | | | | | |
| (Croatia) 2016 | Intermediate round | 11th place | | | | | | | |
| (Croatia) 2018 | Intermediate round | 13th place | | | | | | | |
| (Slovenia) 2020 | Cancelled due to COVID-19 pandemic in Europe | | | | | | | | |
| (Croatia) 2021 | 13th place bracket | 15th place | | | | | | | |
| (Montenegro) 2022 | Disqualified | | | | | | | | |
| (Montenegro) 2024 | Suspended | | | | | | | | |
| (Serbia) 2026 | Suspended | | | | | | | | |
| Total | 12/17 | 1 Title | | | | | | | |

- 2021 tournament was under-19. It was held in a move to lessen the COVID-19 pandemic's impact on national team players born in 2002.
- Russia was excluded from the 2022 championship after its invasion of Ukraine.
