= France men's national youth handball team =

France

Information
- Association: French Handball Federation
- Coach: Franck Prouff

Colours
| 1st | 2nd |

Results

World Championship
- Appearances: 7 (First in 2009)
- Best result: (gold) Champions : (2015, 2017)

European Youth Championship
- Appearances: 14 (First in 1999)
- Best result: (gold) Champions : (2014, 2016)
- Last updated on Unknown.

The France national youth handball team is the national under-19 handball team of France that represents France in international matches. It is managed by the French Handball Federation, an affiliate of the International Handball Federation (IHF) and a member of the European Handball Federation (EHF).

The team competes in the IHF U19 Handball World Championship and the European U-18 Handball Championship (called the M18 EHF EURO), which it has both won twice.

The team is referred as the "U19" and "U19M".

Since 2023, Franck Prouff is the current head coach.

== History ==
=== Youth Olympic Games ===
Champions Runners up Third place Fourth place

Youth Olympic Games record
| Year | Round | Position | GP | W | D | L | GS | GA | GD |
|---|---|---|---|---|---|---|---|---|---|
| (Singapore) 2010 | Didn't Qualify | | | | | | | | |
| (China) 2014 | Didn't Qualify | | | | | | | | |
| (Argentina) 2018 | No Handball Event | | | | | | | | |
| (Senegal) 2022 | No Handball Event | | | | | | | | |
| Total | 0 / 2 | 0 Titles | | | | | | | |

=== IHF Youth World Championship ===
Champions Runners up Third place Fourth place

Youth World Championship record
| Year | Round | Position | GP | W | D* | L | GS | GA | GD |
|---|---|---|---|---|---|---|---|---|---|
| (Qatar) 2005 | Didn't Qualify | | | | | | | | |
| (Bahrain) 2007 | Didn't Qualify | | | | | | | | |
| (Tunisia) 2009 | | 9th place | | | | | | | |
| (Argentina) 2011 | Semi-Finals | 4th place | | | | | | | |
| (Hungary) 2013 | | 13th place | | | | | | | |
| (Russia) 2015 | Final | 1st place | | | | | | | |
| (Georgia (country)) 2017 | Final | 1st place | | | | | | | |
| (North Macedonia) 2019 | | 6th place | | | | | | | |
| (Greece) 2021 | Cancelled due to the COVID-19 pandemic | | | | | | | | |
| (Croatia) 2023 | Didn't Qualify | | | | | | | | |
| (Egypt) 2025 | | 9th place | | | | | | | |
| Total | 7/10 | 2 Titles | | | | | | | |

=== EHF European Youth Championship ===
Champions Runners up Third place Fourth place

European Youth Championship record
| Year | Round | Position | GP | W | D | L | GS | GA | GD |
|---|---|---|---|---|---|---|---|---|---|
| (Switzerland) 1992 | Didn't Qualify | | | | | | | | |
| (Israel) 1994 | Didn't Qualify | | | | | | | | |
| (Estonia) 1997 | Didn't Qualify | | | | | | | | |
| (Portugal) 1999 | | 11th place | | | | | | | |
| (Luxembourg) 2001 | | 5th place | | | | | | | |
| (Slovakia) 2003 | | 10th place | | | | | | | |
| (Serbia and Montenegro) 2004 | | 9th place | | | | | | | |
| (Estonia) 2006 | | 6th place | | | | | | | |
| (Czech Republic) 2008 | | 7th place | | | | | | | |
| (Montenegro) 2010 | Didn't Qualify | | | | | | | | |
| (Austria) 2012 | | 12th place | | | | | | | |
| (Poland) 2014 | Final | Champions | | | | | | | |
| (Croatia) 2016 | Final | Champions | | | | | | | |
| (Croatia) 2018 | Main Round | 7th place | | | | | | | |
| (Slovenia) 2020 | Cancelled due to the COVID-19 pandemic | | | | | | | | |
| (Croatia) 2021^{a} | | 10th place | | | | | | | |
| (Montenegro) 2022 | Group stage | 14th place | | | | | | | |
| (Montenegro) 2024 | Intermediate Round | 12th place | | | | | | | |
| (Serbia) 2026 | 7th place match | 7th place | | | | | | | |
| Total | 14/18 | 2 Titles | | | | | | | |

^{a} The European Handball Federation decided to hold an U-19 European Championship in 2021, in a move to lessen the COVID-19 pandemic’s impact for national team players born in 2002.

== Staff ==
Head coaches :

- Éric Quintin (2010–2021)
- Pascal Person (2021–2023)
- Franck Prouff (2023–)
