= 2022 European Men's U-18 Handball Championship =

Tournament details
- Host country: Montenegro
- Venues: 2 (in 1 host city)
- Dates: 4–14 August 2022
- Teams: 16 (from 1 confederation)

Final positions
- Champions: Spain (2nd title)
- Runners-up: Sweden
- Third place: Germany
- Fourth place: Hungary

Tournament statistics
- Matches played: 56
- Goals scored: 3,340 (59.64 per match)
- Attendance: 10,978 (196 per match)
- Top scorer: (Faroe Islands) Óli Mittún (80 goals)

Awards
- Best player: (Faroe Islands) Óli Mittún

The 2022 European Men's U-18 Handball Championship was the sixteenth edition of the European Men's U-18 Handball Championship, held in Podgorica, Montenegro from 4 to 14 August 2022.

== Qualification ==
Competition	Dates	Host	Vacancies	Qualified
Men's 19 EHF EURO 2021	12–22 August 2021	Croatia	13	Germany; Croatia; Spain; Slovenia; Denmark; Portugal; Sweden; Iceland; Hungary; France; Norway; Italy; Serbia
Men's 19 EHF Championship 2021	9–15 August 2021	(North Macedonia) Skopje	1	Poland
Men's 19 EHF Championship 2021	16–22 August 2021	(Latvia) Riga	1	Montenegro
Men's 19 EHF Championship 2021	16–22 August 2021	(Bulgaria) Varna	1	Faroe Islands

== Draw ==
The draw was held on 24 February 2022 in Vienna.

Pot 1	Pot 2	Pot 3	Pot 4
Germany; Croatia; Spain; Slovenia	Denmark; Portugal; Sweden; Iceland	Hungary; France; Norway; Italy	Serbia; Faroe Islands; Montenegro; Poland

== Preliminary round ==
All times are local (UTC+2).

=== Group A ===
Pos	Team	Pld	W	D	L	GF	GA	GD	Pts	Qualification
1	Hungary	3	3	0	0	99	87	+12	6	Main round
2	Germany	3	2	0	1	100	95	+5	4	Main round
3	Iceland	3	1	0	2	92	90	+2	2	Intermediate round
4	Poland	3	0	0	3	86	105	−19	0	Intermediate round

Source: EHF
Rules for classification: 1) points; 2) head-to-head points; 3) head-to-head goal difference; 4) head-to-head number of goals scored; 5) Goal difference.

4 August 2022; 13:45	Germany	32–35	Hungary	Verde Complex, Podgorica; Attendance: 150; Referees: Covalciuc, Covalciuc (MDA)
4 August 2022; 13:45	Móré 8	(14–13)	Kovács 15	Verde Complex, Podgorica; Attendance: 150; Referees: Covalciuc, Covalciuc (MDA)
4 August 2022; 13:45	5× (suspension)	Report	4× (suspension)	Verde Complex, Podgorica; Attendance: 150; Referees: Covalciuc, Covalciuc (MDA)

4 August 2022; 15:45	Iceland	38–25	Poland	Verde Complex, Podgorica; Attendance: 150; Referees: Weijmans, Wolbertus (NED)
4 August 2022; 15:45	Erlingsson 7	(20–11)	Kamiński 5	Verde Complex, Podgorica; Attendance: 150; Referees: Weijmans, Wolbertus (NED)
4 August 2022; 15:45	2× (yellow card) 5× (suspension) 1× (red card)	Report	1× (suspension)	Verde Complex, Podgorica; Attendance: 150; Referees: Weijmans, Wolbertus (NED)

5 August 2022; 14:00	Poland	29–33	Germany	Verde Complex, Podgorica; Attendance: 150; Referees: Backovic, Palackovic (SLO)
5 August 2022; 14:00	Wasiak 7	(14–15)	Móré 11	Verde Complex, Podgorica; Attendance: 150; Referees: Backovic, Palackovic (SLO)
5 August 2022; 14:00	1× (yellow card) 6× (suspension)	Report	1× (yellow card) 4× (suspension) 1× (red card)	Verde Complex, Podgorica; Attendance: 150; Referees: Backovic, Palackovic (SLO)

5 August 2022; 16:00	Hungary	30–23	Iceland	Verde Complex, Podgorica; Attendance: 200; Referees: Arnautović, Jović (BIH)
5 August 2022; 16:00	Kovács 6	(15–11)	Arnarson 5	Verde Complex, Podgorica; Attendance: 200; Referees: Arnautović, Jović (BIH)
5 August 2022; 16:00	1× (yellow card) 4× (suspension)	Report	2× (yellow card) 2× (suspension)	Verde Complex, Podgorica; Attendance: 200; Referees: Arnautović, Jović (BIH)

7 August 2022; 14:00	Germany	35–31	Iceland	Verde Complex, Podgorica; Attendance: 560; Referees: Sekulić, Jovandić (SRB)
7 August 2022; 14:00	Mart 8	(18–18)	Erlingsson 9	Verde Complex, Podgorica; Attendance: 560; Referees: Sekulić, Jovandić (SRB)
7 August 2022; 14:00	4× (suspension)	Report	1× (yellow card) 2× (suspension)	Verde Complex, Podgorica; Attendance: 560; Referees: Sekulić, Jovandić (SRB)

7 August 2022; 16:00	Hungary	34–32	Poland	Verde Complex, Podgorica; Attendance: 60; Referees: Borge, Nygren (NOR)
7 August 2022; 16:00	Kovács 5	(19–14)	Curzytek, Kamiński 5	Verde Complex, Podgorica; Attendance: 60; Referees: Borge, Nygren (NOR)
7 August 2022; 16:00	6× (suspension)	Report	4× (suspension)	Verde Complex, Podgorica; Attendance: 60; Referees: Borge, Nygren (NOR)

=== Group B ===
Pos	Team	Pld	W	D	L	GF	GA	GD	Pts	Qualification
1	Portugal	3	3	0	0	94	66	+28	6	Main round
2	Croatia	3	2	0	1	105	77	+28	4	Main round
3	Montenegro (H)	3	1	0	2	76	99	−23	2	Intermediate round
4	Italy	3	0	0	3	71	104	−33	0	Intermediate round

Source: EHF
Rules for classification: 1) points; 2) head-to-head points; 3) head-to-head goal difference; 4) head-to-head number of goals scored; 5) Goal difference.
(H) Hosts

4 August 2022; 18:00	Portugal	31–24	Montenegro	Verde Complex, Podgorica; Attendance: 150; Referees: Backovic, Palackovic (SLO)
4 August 2022; 18:00	Cavalcanti 6	(16–13)	Premović 8	Verde Complex, Podgorica; Attendance: 150; Referees: Backovic, Palackovic (SLO)
4 August 2022; 18:00	3× (suspension)	Report	1× (yellow card) 4× (suspension)	Verde Complex, Podgorica; Attendance: 150; Referees: Backovic, Palackovic (SLO)

4 August 2022; 20:00	Croatia	35–31	Italy	Verde Complex, Podgorica; Attendance: 150; Referees: Borge, Nygren (NOR)
4 August 2022; 20:00	Ivanović 7	(17–16)	De Angelis 14	Verde Complex, Podgorica; Attendance: 150; Referees: Borge, Nygren (NOR)
4 August 2022; 20:00	1× (yellow card) 3× (suspension)	Report	5× (suspension)	Verde Complex, Podgorica; Attendance: 150; Referees: Borge, Nygren (NOR)

5 August 2022; 18:00	Montenegro	21–46	Croatia	Verde Complex, Podgorica; Attendance: 215; Referees: Covalciuc, Covalciuc (MDA)
5 August 2022; 18:00	Premović 6	(12–23)	Zivkovic 8	Verde Complex, Podgorica; Attendance: 215; Referees: Covalciuc, Covalciuc (MDA)
5 August 2022; 18:00	3× (suspension)	Report	1× (yellow card) 1× (suspension)	Verde Complex, Podgorica; Attendance: 215; Referees: Covalciuc, Covalciuc (MDA)

5 August 2022; 20:00	Italy	18–38	Portugal	Verde Complex, Podgorica; Attendance: 100; Referees: Sekulić, Jovandić (SRB)
5 August 2022; 20:00	three players 4	(10–14)	Costa 7	Verde Complex, Podgorica; Attendance: 100; Referees: Sekulić, Jovandić (SRB)
5 August 2022; 20:00	2× (suspension)	Report	2× (suspension)	Verde Complex, Podgorica; Attendance: 100; Referees: Sekulić, Jovandić (SRB)

7 August 2022; 18:00	Italy	22–31	Montenegro	Verde Complex, Podgorica; Attendance: 130; Referees: Arnautović, Jović (BIH)
7 August 2022; 18:00	De Angelis 6	(10–16)	Dobrkovic 7	Verde Complex, Podgorica; Attendance: 130; Referees: Arnautović, Jović (BIH)
7 August 2022; 18:00	1× (yellow card) 2× (suspension) 1× (red card)	Report	1× (suspension)	Verde Complex, Podgorica; Attendance: 130; Referees: Arnautović, Jović (BIH)

7 August 2022; 20:00	Croatia	24–25	Portugal	Verde Complex, Podgorica; Attendance: 100; Referees: Barysas, Petrusis (LTU)
7 August 2022; 20:00	Capric 7	(16–15)	Ferreira 6	Verde Complex, Podgorica; Attendance: 100; Referees: Barysas, Petrusis (LTU)
7 August 2022; 20:00	1× (yellow card) 3× (suspension)	Report	1× (yellow card) 6× (suspension) 1× (red card)	Verde Complex, Podgorica; Attendance: 100; Referees: Barysas, Petrusis (LTU)

=== Group C ===
Pos	Team	Pld	W	D	L	GF	GA	GD	Pts	Qualification
1	Norway	3	3	0	0	98	89	+9	6	Main round
2	Denmark	3	1	1	1	92	86	+6	3	Main round
3	Serbia	3	1	1	1	83	85	−2	3	Intermediate round
4	Slovenia	3	0	0	3	84	97	−13	0	Intermediate round

Source: EHF
Rules for classification: 1) points; 2) head-to-head points; 3) head-to-head goal difference; 4) head-to-head number of goals scored; 5) Goal difference.

4 August 2022; 18:00	Slovenia	30–31	Norway	S.C. Morača, Podgorica; Attendance: 240; Referees: Petursson, Thrastarson (ISL)
4 August 2022; 18:00	Hriberšek, Nadarevic 6	(18–17)	Havsgård 5	S.C. Morača, Podgorica; Attendance: 240; Referees: Petursson, Thrastarson (ISL)
4 August 2022; 18:00	2× (yellow card) 5× (suspension)	Report	1× (yellow card) 4× (suspension)	S.C. Morača, Podgorica; Attendance: 240; Referees: Petursson, Thrastarson (ISL)

4 August 2022; 20:00	Denmark	25–25	Serbia	S.C. Morača, Podgorica; Attendance: 107; Referees: Barysas, Petrusis (LTU)
4 August 2022; 20:00	Tonnesen, Vilhelmsen 6	(14–14)	Mitrović 7	S.C. Morača, Podgorica; Attendance: 107; Referees: Barysas, Petrusis (LTU)
4 August 2022; 20:00	2× (suspension)	Report	1× (yellow card) 3× (suspension)	S.C. Morača, Podgorica; Attendance: 107; Referees: Barysas, Petrusis (LTU)

5 August 2022; 18:00	Serbia	30–25	Slovenia	S.C. Morača, Podgorica; Attendance: 550; Referees: Weijmans, Wolbertus (NED)
5 August 2022; 18:00	Antonijević 7	(16–14)	Hriberšek 5	S.C. Morača, Podgorica; Attendance: 550; Referees: Weijmans, Wolbertus (NED)
5 August 2022; 18:00	3× (yellow card) 4× (suspension) 1× (red card)	Report	1× (yellow card) 4× (suspension)	S.C. Morača, Podgorica; Attendance: 550; Referees: Weijmans, Wolbertus (NED)

5 August 2022; 20:00	Norway	32–31	Denmark	S.C. Morača, Podgorica; Attendance: 250; Referees: Ivanovic, Vujisic (MNE)
5 August 2022; 20:00	Edland 7	(15–13)	Tonnesen 9	S.C. Morača, Podgorica; Attendance: 250; Referees: Ivanovic, Vujisic (MNE)
5 August 2022; 20:00	5× (suspension)	Report	1× (yellow card) 5× (suspension)	S.C. Morača, Podgorica; Attendance: 250; Referees: Ivanovic, Vujisic (MNE)

7 August 2022; 18:00	Slovenia	29–36	Denmark	S.C. Morača, Podgorica; Attendance: 83; Referees: Weijmans, Wolbertus (NED)
7 August 2022; 18:00	Hriberšek 7	(10–17)	Pedersen, Vilhelmsen 7	S.C. Morača, Podgorica; Attendance: 83; Referees: Weijmans, Wolbertus (NED)
7 August 2022; 18:00	1× (yellow card) 2× (suspension)	Report	2× (yellow card) 3× (suspension)	S.C. Morača, Podgorica; Attendance: 83; Referees: Weijmans, Wolbertus (NED)

7 August 2022; 20:00	Norway	35–28	Serbia	S.C. Morača, Podgorica; Attendance: 200; Referees: Covalciuc, Covalciuc (MDA)
7 August 2022; 20:00	Larsen 8	(16–11)	Mitrović 8	S.C. Morača, Podgorica; Attendance: 200; Referees: Covalciuc, Covalciuc (MDA)
7 August 2022; 20:00	1× (yellow card) 4× (suspension)	Report	1× (yellow card) 5× (suspension)	S.C. Morača, Podgorica; Attendance: 200; Referees: Covalciuc, Covalciuc (MDA)

=== Group D ===
Pos	Team	Pld	W	D	L	GF	GA	GD	Pts	Qualification
1	Spain	3	3	0	0	116	91	+25	6	Main round
2	Sweden	3	2	0	1	99	100	−1	4	Main round
3	Faroe Islands	3	1	0	2	83	93	−10	2	Intermediate round
4	France	3	0	0	3	90	104	−14	0	Intermediate round

Source: EHF
Rules for classification: 1) points; 2) head-to-head points; 3) head-to-head goal difference; 4) head-to-head number of goals scored; 5) Goal difference.

4 August 2022; 14:00	Spain	41–33	France	S.C. Morača, Podgorica; Attendance: 100; Referees: Arnautović, Jović (BIH)
4 August 2022; 14:00	Oliveras 8	(21–17)	Favril 8	S.C. Morača, Podgorica; Attendance: 100; Referees: Arnautović, Jović (BIH)
4 August 2022; 14:00	1× (yellow card) 1× (suspension)	Report	2× (suspension)	S.C. Morača, Podgorica; Attendance: 100; Referees: Arnautović, Jović (BIH)

4 August 2022; 16:00	Sweden	32–29	Faroe Islands	S.C. Morača, Podgorica; Attendance: 200; Referees: Fahner, Kubis (POL)
4 August 2022; 16:00	Månsson 9	(17–15)	Mittún 17	S.C. Morača, Podgorica; Attendance: 200; Referees: Fahner, Kubis (POL)
4 August 2022; 16:00	1× (yellow card) 4× (suspension)	Report	4× (suspension)	S.C. Morača, Podgorica; Attendance: 200; Referees: Fahner, Kubis (POL)

5 August 2022; 14:00	Faroe Islands	25–35	Spain	S.C. Morača, Podgorica; Attendance: 150; Referees: Petursson, Thrastarson (ISL)
5 August 2022; 14:00	Mittún, Poulsen 7	(9–18)	P. Cikusa Jelicic 6	S.C. Morača, Podgorica; Attendance: 150; Referees: Petursson, Thrastarson (ISL)
5 August 2022; 14:00	3× (suspension)	Report	1× (yellow card) 6× (suspension)	S.C. Morača, Podgorica; Attendance: 150; Referees: Petursson, Thrastarson (ISL)

5 August 2022; 16:00	France	31–34	Sweden	S.C. Morača, Podgorica; Attendance: 150; Referees: Barysas, Petrusis (LTU)
5 August 2022; 16:00	Traoré 7	(16–19)	Lundstad, Segertoft 7	S.C. Morača, Podgorica; Attendance: 150; Referees: Barysas, Petrusis (LTU)
5 August 2022; 16:00	1× (yellow card) 3× (suspension)	Report	5× (suspension)	S.C. Morača, Podgorica; Attendance: 150; Referees: Barysas, Petrusis (LTU)

7 August 2022; 14:00	Spain	40–33	Sweden	S.C. Morača, Podgorica; Attendance: 150; Referees: Ivanovic, Vujisic (MNE)
7 August 2022; 14:00	González Unciti 9	(19–18)	Sundewall 6	S.C. Morača, Podgorica; Attendance: 150; Referees: Ivanovic, Vujisic (MNE)
7 August 2022; 14:00	6× (suspension)	Report	9× (suspension)	S.C. Morača, Podgorica; Attendance: 150; Referees: Ivanovic, Vujisic (MNE)

7 August 2022; 16:00	France	26–29	Faroe Islands	S.C. Morača, Podgorica; Attendance: 150; Referees: Fahner, Kubis (POL)
7 August 2022; 16:00	Lanfranchi 6	(14–12)	Mittún 13	S.C. Morača, Podgorica; Attendance: 150; Referees: Fahner, Kubis (POL)
7 August 2022; 16:00	6× (suspension)	Report	3× (suspension)	S.C. Morača, Podgorica; Attendance: 150; Referees: Fahner, Kubis (POL)

== Intermediate round ==
Points and goals gained in the preliminary group against teams that proceeded to the Intermediate round was transferred.

=== Group I1 ===
Pos	Team	Pld	W	D	L	GF	GA	GD	Pts	Qualification
1	Iceland	3	3	0	0	102	82	+20	6	9–12th place semifinals
2	Montenegro (H)	3	2	0	1	90	79	+11	4	9–12th place semifinals
3	Poland	3	1	0	2	83	97	−14	2	13–16th place semifinals
4	Italy	3	0	0	3	79	96	−17	0	13–16th place semifinals

Source: EHF
Rules for classification: 1) points; 2) head-to-head points; 3) head-to-head goal difference; 4) head-to-head number of goals scored; 5) Goal difference.
(H) Hosts

9 August 2022; 14:00	Poland	31–29	Italy	Verde Complex, Podgorica; Attendance: 55; Referees: Ivanovic, Vujisic (MNE)
9 August 2022; 14:00	Wasiak 9	(18–15)	De Angelis 13	Verde Complex, Podgorica; Attendance: 55; Referees: Ivanovic, Vujisic (MNE)
9 August 2022; 14:00	1× (yellow card) 5× (suspension)	Report	7× (suspension)	Verde Complex, Podgorica; Attendance: 55; Referees: Ivanovic, Vujisic (MNE)

9 August 2022; 16:00	Iceland	30–29	Montenegro	Verde Complex, Podgorica; Attendance: 800; Referees: Fahner, Kubis (POL)
9 August 2022; 16:00	Júlíusson, Reimarsson 6	(15–16)	Premović 8	Verde Complex, Podgorica; Attendance: 800; Referees: Fahner, Kubis (POL)
9 August 2022; 16:00	3× (suspension)	Report	1× (yellow card) 5× (suspension)	Verde Complex, Podgorica; Attendance: 800; Referees: Fahner, Kubis (POL)

10 August 2022; 14:00	Italy	28–34	Iceland	Verde Complex, Podgorica; Attendance: 56; Referees: Covalciuc, Covalciuc (MDA)
10 August 2022; 14:00	Manojlovic 10	(15–16)	Haraldsson 9	Verde Complex, Podgorica; Attendance: 56; Referees: Covalciuc, Covalciuc (MDA)
10 August 2022; 14:00	2× (suspension)	Report	2× (suspension)	Verde Complex, Podgorica; Attendance: 56; Referees: Covalciuc, Covalciuc (MDA)

10 August 2022; 16:00	Montenegro	30–27	Poland	Verde Complex, Podgorica; Attendance: 250; Referees: Petursson, Thrastarson (ISL)
10 August 2022; 16:00	Dobrkovic 9	(15–17)	Kamiński 6	Verde Complex, Podgorica; Attendance: 250; Referees: Petursson, Thrastarson (ISL)
10 August 2022; 16:00	2× (yellow card) 7× (suspension)	Report	5× (suspension)	Verde Complex, Podgorica; Attendance: 250; Referees: Petursson, Thrastarson (ISL)

=== Group I2 ===
Pos	Team	Pld	W	D	L	GF	GA	GD	Pts	Qualification
1	Faroe Islands	3	2	0	1	81	83	−2	4	9–12th place semifinals
2	Slovenia	3	1	1	1	83	78	+5	3	9–12th place semifinals
3	France	3	1	1	1	90	89	+1	3	13–16th place semifinals
4	Serbia	3	1	0	2	89	93	−4	2	13–16th place semifinals

Source: EHF
Rules for classification: 1) points; 2) head-to-head points; 3) head-to-head goal difference; 4) head-to-head number of goals scored; 5) Goal difference.

9 August 2022; 14:00	Slovenia	25–25	France	S.C. Morača, Podgorica; Attendance: 100; Referees: Arnautović, Jović (BIH)
9 August 2022; 14:00	Hriberšek, Zajc 6	(15–14)	Favril, Peyre 7	S.C. Morača, Podgorica; Attendance: 100; Referees: Arnautović, Jović (BIH)
9 August 2022; 14:00	1× (suspension)	Report	2× (suspension) 1× (red card)	S.C. Morača, Podgorica; Attendance: 100; Referees: Arnautović, Jović (BIH)

9 August 2022; 16:00	Serbia	24–29	Faroe Islands	S.C. Morača, Podgorica; Attendance: 150; Referees: Barysas, Petrusis (LTU)
9 August 2022; 16:00	Antonijević 6	(15–14)	Mittún 13	S.C. Morača, Podgorica; Attendance: 150; Referees: Barysas, Petrusis (LTU)
9 August 2022; 16:00	2× (suspension)	Report	7× (suspension) 1× (red card)	S.C. Morača, Podgorica; Attendance: 150; Referees: Barysas, Petrusis (LTU)

10 August 2022; 14:00	France	39–35	Serbia	S.C. Morača, Podgorica; Attendance: 150; Referees: Borge, Nygren (NOR)
10 August 2022; 14:00	Devoldere 9	(22–15)	Šijan 13	S.C. Morača, Podgorica; Attendance: 150; Referees: Borge, Nygren (NOR)
10 August 2022; 14:00	1× (yellow card) 4× (suspension)	Report	3× (suspension)	S.C. Morača, Podgorica; Attendance: 150; Referees: Borge, Nygren (NOR)

10 August 2022; 16:00	Faroe Islands	23–33	Slovenia	S.C. Morača, Podgorica; Attendance: 143; Referees: Sekulić, Jovandić (SRB)
10 August 2022; 16:00	Mittún 7	(13–20)	Hriberšek 7	S.C. Morača, Podgorica; Attendance: 143; Referees: Sekulić, Jovandić (SRB)
10 August 2022; 16:00	3× (suspension)	Report	5× (suspension)	S.C. Morača, Podgorica; Attendance: 143; Referees: Sekulić, Jovandić (SRB)

== Main round ==
Points and goals gained in the preliminary group against teams that advanced was transferred to the main round.

=== Group M1 ===
Pos	Team	Pld	W	D	L	GF	GA	GD	Pts	Qualification
1	Hungary	3	2	0	1	84	83	+1	4	Semifinals
2	Germany	3	1	1	1	89	84	+5	3	Semifinals
3	Portugal	3	1	1	1	71	71	0	3	5–8th place semifinals
4	Croatia	3	1	0	2	78	84	−6	2	5–8th place semifinals

Source: EHF
Rules for classification: 1) points; 2) head-to-head points; 3) head-to-head goal difference; 4) head-to-head number of goals scored; 5) Goal difference.

9 August 2022; 18:00	Germany	34–26	Croatia	Verde Complex, Podgorica; Attendance: 300; Referees: Borge, Nygren (NOR)
9 August 2022; 18:00	Móré 10	(17–11)	Bartolić, Zivkovic 5	Verde Complex, Podgorica; Attendance: 300; Referees: Borge, Nygren (NOR)
9 August 2022; 18:00	4× (suspension)	Report	4× (suspension) 1× (red card)	Verde Complex, Podgorica; Attendance: 300; Referees: Borge, Nygren (NOR)

9 August 2022; 20:00	Hungary	24–23	Portugal	Verde Complex, Podgorica; Attendance: 92; Referees: Petursson, Thrastarson (ISL)
9 August 2022; 20:00	Csörgő 12	(9–12)	Cavalcanti 7	Verde Complex, Podgorica; Attendance: 92; Referees: Petursson, Thrastarson (ISL)
9 August 2022; 20:00	5× (suspension)	Report	1× (yellow card) 3× (suspension)	Verde Complex, Podgorica; Attendance: 92; Referees: Petursson, Thrastarson (ISL)

10 August 2022; 18:00	Croatia	28–25	Hungary	Verde Complex, Podgorica; Attendance: 100; Referees: Barysas, Petrusis (LTU)
10 August 2022; 18:00	Capric, Glivetic 6	(12–13)	Terjék 7	Verde Complex, Podgorica; Attendance: 100; Referees: Barysas, Petrusis (LTU)
10 August 2022; 18:00	5× (suspension)	Report	4× (suspension)	Verde Complex, Podgorica; Attendance: 100; Referees: Barysas, Petrusis (LTU)

10 August 2022; 20:00	Portugal	23–23	Germany	Verde Complex, Podgorica; Attendance: 380; Referees: Arnautović, Jović (BIH)
10 August 2022; 20:00	Costa 10	(11–12)	Haake 8	Verde Complex, Podgorica; Attendance: 380; Referees: Arnautović, Jović (BIH)
10 August 2022; 20:00	1× (suspension)	Report	1× (yellow card) 2× (suspension)	Verde Complex, Podgorica; Attendance: 380; Referees: Arnautović, Jović (BIH)

=== Group M2 ===
Pos	Team	Pld	W	D	L	GF	GA	GD	Pts	Qualification
1	Spain	3	3	0	0	106	91	+15	6	Semifinals
2	Sweden	3	2	0	1	93	94	−1	4	Semifinals
3	Norway	3	1	0	2	87	96	−9	2	5–8th place semifinals
4	Denmark	3	0	0	3	88	93	−5	0	5–8th place semifinals

Source: EHF
Rules for classification: 1) points; 2) head-to-head points; 3) head-to-head goal difference; 4) head-to-head number of goals scored; 5) Goal difference.

9 August 2022; 18:00	Denmark	29–32	Sweden	S.C. Morača, Podgorica; Attendance: 150; Referees: Covalciuc, Covalciuc (MDA)
9 August 2022; 18:00	Vestergaard 6	(17–15)	Månsson 10	S.C. Morača, Podgorica; Attendance: 150; Referees: Covalciuc, Covalciuc (MDA)
9 August 2022; 18:00	3× (suspension)	Report	1× (suspension)	S.C. Morača, Podgorica; Attendance: 150; Referees: Covalciuc, Covalciuc (MDA)

9 August 2022; 20:00	Norway	30–37	Spain	S.C. Morača, Podgorica; Attendance: 200; Referees: Sekulić, Jovandić (SRB)
9 August 2022; 20:00	Røisland 7	(15–17)	P. Cikusa Jelicic 7	S.C. Morača, Podgorica; Attendance: 200; Referees: Sekulić, Jovandić (SRB)
9 August 2022; 20:00	3× (suspension)	Report	4× (suspension)	S.C. Morača, Podgorica; Attendance: 200; Referees: Sekulić, Jovandić (SRB)

10 August 2022; 18:00	Sweden	28–25	Norway	S.C. Morača, Podgorica; Attendance: 120; Referees: Weijmans, Wolbertus (NED)
10 August 2022; 18:00	Gustavsson 6	(12–13)	Larsen 7	S.C. Morača, Podgorica; Attendance: 120; Referees: Weijmans, Wolbertus (NED)
10 August 2022; 18:00	1× (yellow card) 4× (suspension)	Report	1× (yellow card) 2× (suspension)	S.C. Morača, Podgorica; Attendance: 120; Referees: Weijmans, Wolbertus (NED)

10 August 2022; 20:00	Spain	29–28	Denmark	S.C. Morača, Podgorica; Attendance: 200; Referees: Ivanovic, Vujisic (MNE)
10 August 2022; 20:00	four players 4	(11–14)	Vilhelmsen 14	S.C. Morača, Podgorica; Attendance: 200; Referees: Ivanovic, Vujisic (MNE)
10 August 2022; 20:00	1× (yellow card) 4× (suspension)	Report	1× (yellow card) 5× (suspension)	S.C. Morača, Podgorica; Attendance: 200; Referees: Ivanovic, Vujisic (MNE)

== Final round ==
=== Bracket ===
Championship bracket

Semifinals
12 August
Hungary	30
Sweden	33
12 August
Spain	32
Germany	29

Final
14 August
Sweden	32
Spain	34
Third place
14 August
Hungary	22
Germany	29

9th place bracket

9–12th place semifinals
12 August
Iceland (Pen.)	30
Slovenia	29
12 August
Faroe Islands	30
Montenegro	24

9th place
13 August
Iceland	27
Faroe Islands	29
11th place
13 August
Slovenia	28
Montenegro	26

5th place bracket

5–8th place semifinals
12 August
Portugal	32
Denmark	33
12 August
Norway	26
Croatia	29

5th place
14 August
Denmark	26
Croatia	28
7th place
14 August
Portugal	30
Norway	35

13th place bracket

13–16th place semifinals
12 August
Poland	30
Serbia	33
12 August
France	39
Italy	27

13th place
13 August
Serbia	28
France	24
15th place
13 August
Poland	39
Italy	34

=== 13–16th place semifinals ===
12 August 2022; 13:00	Poland	30–33	Serbia	S.C. Morača, Podgorica; Attendance: 100; Referees: Borge, Nygren (NOR)
12 August 2022; 13:00	Wasiak 6	(12–14)	Šijan, Vujović 7	S.C. Morača, Podgorica; Attendance: 100; Referees: Borge, Nygren (NOR)
12 August 2022; 13:00	1× (suspension)	Report	1× (yellow card) 3× (suspension)	S.C. Morača, Podgorica; Attendance: 100; Referees: Borge, Nygren (NOR)

12 August 2022; 15:30	France	39–27	Italy	S.C. Morača, Podgorica; Attendance: 175; Referees: Ivanovic, Vujisic (MNE)
12 August 2022; 15:30	Favril 7	(19–16)	De Angelis 11	S.C. Morača, Podgorica; Attendance: 175; Referees: Ivanovic, Vujisic (MNE)
12 August 2022; 15:30	4× (suspension) 1× (red card)	Report	4× (suspension) 1× (red card)	S.C. Morača, Podgorica; Attendance: 175; Referees: Ivanovic, Vujisic (MNE)

=== 9–12th place semifinals ===
12 August 2022
18:00
Iceland
30–29 (Pen.)
Slovenia
S.C. Morača, Podgorica
Attendance: 70
Referees: Sekulić, Jovandić (SRB)
Einarsson 5
(14–9)
Marguč 10
4× (suspension) 1× (red card)
Report
2× (yellow card) 2× (suspension) 1× (red card)

FT: 26–26 Pen: 4–3

12 August 2022; 20:30	Faroe Islands	30–24	Montenegro	S.C. Morača, Podgorica; Attendance: 82; Referees: Fahner, Kubis (POL)
12 August 2022; 20:30	Mittún 12	(15–10)	Dobrkovic, Premović 7	S.C. Morača, Podgorica; Attendance: 82; Referees: Fahner, Kubis (POL)
12 August 2022; 20:30	6× (suspension)	Report	1× (yellow card) 3× (suspension)	S.C. Morača, Podgorica; Attendance: 82; Referees: Fahner, Kubis (POL)

=== 5–8th place semifinals ===
12 August 2022; 13:00	Portugal	32–33	Denmark	Verde Complex, Podgorica; Attendance: 100; Referees: Arnautović, Jović (BIH)
12 August 2022; 13:00	Costa 12	(16–18)	Lykke 12	Verde Complex, Podgorica; Attendance: 100; Referees: Arnautović, Jović (BIH)
12 August 2022; 13:00	3× (suspension)	Report	2× (suspension)	Verde Complex, Podgorica; Attendance: 100; Referees: Arnautović, Jović (BIH)

12 August 2022; 15:30	Norway	26–29	Croatia	Verde Complex, Podgorica; Attendance: 70; Referees: Weijmans, Wolbertus (NED)
12 August 2022; 15:30	Larsen 5	(12–13)	Ivanović, Krupić 6	Verde Complex, Podgorica; Attendance: 70; Referees: Weijmans, Wolbertus (NED)
12 August 2022; 15:30	2× (suspension)	Report	4× (suspension)	Verde Complex, Podgorica; Attendance: 70; Referees: Weijmans, Wolbertus (NED)

=== Semifinals ===
12 August 2022; 18:00	Hungary	30–33	Sweden	Verde Complex, Podgorica; Attendance: 780; Referees: Petursson, Thrastarson (ISL)
12 August 2022; 18:00	Csörgő 8	(16–15)	Månsson 7	Verde Complex, Podgorica; Attendance: 780; Referees: Petursson, Thrastarson (ISL)
12 August 2022; 18:00	1× (yellow card) 3× (suspension)	Report	1× (yellow card) 4× (suspension)	Verde Complex, Podgorica; Attendance: 780; Referees: Petursson, Thrastarson (ISL)

12 August 2022; 20:30	Spain	32–29	Germany	Verde Complex, Podgorica; Attendance: 400; Referees: Covalciuc, Covalciuc (MDA)
12 August 2022; 20:30	González Unciti 8	(17–12)	Faust 8	Verde Complex, Podgorica; Attendance: 400; Referees: Covalciuc, Covalciuc (MDA)
12 August 2022; 20:30	4× (suspension)	Report	5× (suspension)	Verde Complex, Podgorica; Attendance: 400; Referees: Covalciuc, Covalciuc (MDA)

=== 15th place game ===
13 August 2022; 10:00	Poland	39–34	Italy	S.C. Morača, Podgorica; Attendance: 50; Referees: Weijmans, Wolbertus (NED)
13 August 2022; 10:00	Kamiński 8	(16–18)	De Angelis 11	S.C. Morača, Podgorica; Attendance: 50; Referees: Weijmans, Wolbertus (NED)
13 August 2022; 10:00		Report	3× (suspension)	S.C. Morača, Podgorica; Attendance: 50; Referees: Weijmans, Wolbertus (NED)

=== 13th place game ===
13 August 2022; 12:30	Serbia	28–24	France	S.C. Morača, Podgorica; Attendance: 150; Referees: Petursson, Thrastarson (ISL)
13 August 2022; 12:30	Šijan 17	(14–11)	Simonnet 5	S.C. Morača, Podgorica; Attendance: 150; Referees: Petursson, Thrastarson (ISL)
13 August 2022; 12:30	3× (suspension)	Report	1× (yellow card) 7× (suspension) 1× (red card)	S.C. Morača, Podgorica; Attendance: 150; Referees: Petursson, Thrastarson (ISL)

=== Eleventh place game ===
13 August 2022; 15:00	Slovenia	28–26	Montenegro	S.C. Morača, Podgorica; Attendance: 175; Referees: Borge, Nygren (NOR)
13 August 2022; 15:00	Hriberšek 11	(11–12)	Latković 11	S.C. Morača, Podgorica; Attendance: 175; Referees: Borge, Nygren (NOR)
13 August 2022; 15:00	1× (yellow card) 3× (suspension)	Report	1× (yellow card) 4× (suspension)	S.C. Morača, Podgorica; Attendance: 175; Referees: Borge, Nygren (NOR)

=== Ninth place game ===
13 August 2022; 17:30	Iceland	27–29	Faroe Islands	S.C. Morača, Podgorica; Attendance: 150; Referees: Fahner, Kubis (POL)
13 August 2022; 17:30	Erlingsson 7	(15–13)	Mittún 11	S.C. Morača, Podgorica; Attendance: 150; Referees: Fahner, Kubis (POL)
13 August 2022; 17:30	1× (yellow card) 5× (suspension)	Report	1× (yellow card) 5× (suspension) 1× (red card)	S.C. Morača, Podgorica; Attendance: 150; Referees: Fahner, Kubis (POL)

=== Seventh place game ===
14 August 2022; 10:00	Portugal	30–35	Norway	Verde Complex, Podgorica; Attendance: 60; Referees: Arnautović, Jović (BIH)
14 August 2022; 10:00	Costa, Teixeira 7	(15–15)	Anderson 8	Verde Complex, Podgorica; Attendance: 60; Referees: Arnautović, Jović (BIH)
14 August 2022; 10:00	1× (suspension)	Report		Verde Complex, Podgorica; Attendance: 60; Referees: Arnautović, Jović (BIH)

=== Fifth place game ===
14 August 2022; 12:30	Denmark	26–28	Croatia	Verde Complex, Podgorica; Attendance: 75; Referees: Barysas, Petrusis (LTU)
14 August 2022; 12:30	Vilhelmsen 9	(11–14)	Capric 9	Verde Complex, Podgorica; Attendance: 75; Referees: Barysas, Petrusis (LTU)
14 August 2022; 12:30	2× (yellow card) 3× (suspension)	Report	5× (suspension)	Verde Complex, Podgorica; Attendance: 75; Referees: Barysas, Petrusis (LTU)

=== Third place game ===
14 August 2022; 15:00	Hungary	22–29	Germany	Verde Complex, Podgorica; Attendance: 250; Referees: Ivanovic, Vujisic (MNE)
14 August 2022; 15:00	Kovács, Molnár 5	(12–15)	Móré 6	Verde Complex, Podgorica; Attendance: 250; Referees: Ivanovic, Vujisic (MNE)
14 August 2022; 15:00	2× (yellow card) 3× (suspension)	Report	1× (yellow card) 3× (suspension)	Verde Complex, Podgorica; Attendance: 250; Referees: Ivanovic, Vujisic (MNE)

=== Final ===
14 August 2022; 17:30	Sweden	32–34	Spain	Verde Complex, Podgorica; Attendance: 600; Referees: Sekulić, Jovandić (SRB)
14 August 2022; 17:30	Månsson 13	(16–15)	P. Cikusa Jelicic, Oliveras 6	Verde Complex, Podgorica; Attendance: 600; Referees: Sekulić, Jovandić (SRB)
14 August 2022; 17:30	1× (yellow card) 5× (suspension)	Report	1× (yellow card) 3× (suspension)	Verde Complex, Podgorica; Attendance: 600; Referees: Sekulić, Jovandić (SRB)

== Final ranking ==
Qualified for the 2023 Men's Youth World Handball Championship
Qualified for the 2023 Men's Youth World Handball Championship as a host nation
Relegated to the Men's 18 EHF Championship 2024

Rank	Team
1st place, gold medalist(s)	Spain
2nd place, silver medalist(s)	Sweden
3rd place, bronze medalist(s)	Germany
4	Hungary
5	Croatia
6	Denmark
7	Norway
8	Portugal
9	Faroe Islands
10	Iceland
11	Slovenia
12	Montenegro
13	Serbia
14	France
15	Poland
16	Italy

== Awards ==
Award	Player
Most Valuable Player	Óli Mittún (FRO)
Best Defence Player	Pelle Segertoft (SWE)
Topscorer	Óli Mittún (FRO) (80 goals)

All-Star Team

Position	Player
Goalkeeper	Diogo Rêma Marques (POR)
Right wing	Xavier González Unciti (ESP)
Right back	Djordje Cikusa Jelicic (ESP)
Centre back	Axel Månsson (SWE)
Left back	Kristóf Csörgő (HUN)
Left wing	David Móré (GER)
Pivot	Lars Eirik Larsen (NOR)
