= Teitur Örn Einarsson =

Icelandic handball player (born 1998)

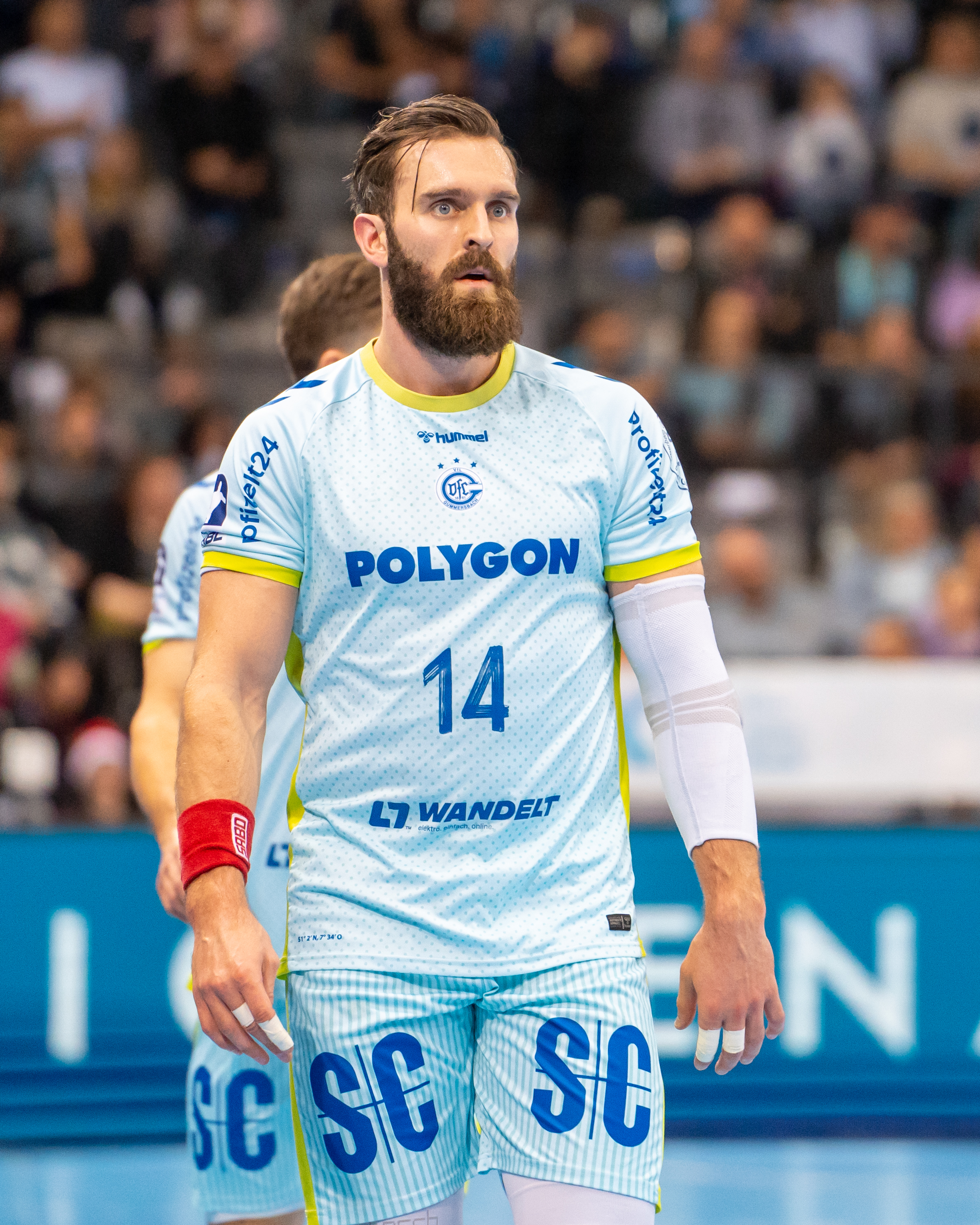

Personal information
- Nationality: Icelandic
- Born: 23 September 1998 (age 28) Selfoss, Iceland
- Height: 1.90 m (6 ft 3 in)

Sport
- Sport: Handball
- Position: Right back
- Current club: VfL Gummersbach
- Number: 14

Senior clubs
- Years: Team
- 2015–2018: Selfoss
- 2018–2021: IFK Kristianstad
- 2021–2024: SG Flensburg-Handewitt
- 2024–: VfL Gummersbach
National team
Years	Team	Apps	(Gls)
2018–	Iceland	36	(36)
- Updated on 5 January 2025

Teitur Örn Einarsson (born 23 September 1998) is an Icelandic handball player for VfL Gummersbach and the Icelandic national team.

He represented Iceland at the 2019 World Men's Handball Championship.

== Club career ==
Teitur Örn Einarsson made his debut for his boyhood club Selfoss in the 2015/2016 season where he helped his team secure a promotion to Úrvalsdeild. In the summer of 2018 he moved to the Swedish Handbollsligan to IFK Kristianstad, where he signed a two-year contract. In October 2021 it was announced he had signed with German SG Flensburg-Handewitt, starting immediately.

== International career ==
Teitur was the top scorer of the 2017 Men's Youth World Handball Championship in Georgia with 66 goals. On 5 April 2018 he made his debut for the Icelandic national team in a 29–31 loss against Norway in a friendly.

At the 2026 European Men's Handball Championship he finished 4th with Iceland, losing to Denmark in the semifinal and Croatia in the third-place playoff.
