= Óli Mittún =

Faroese handball player (born 2005)

Personal information
- Nationality: Faroese
- Born: 10 June 2005 (age 21) Tórshavn, Faroe Islands
- Height: 1.86 m (6 ft 1 in)

Sport
- Sport: Handball
- Position: Left back
- Current club: GOG Håndbold
- Number: 78

Youth career
- Years: Team
- –: H71

Senior clubs
- Years: Team
- 2021–2022: H71
- 2022–2025: IK Sävehof
- 2025–: GOG Håndbold
National team
Years	Team	Apps	(Gls)
2023–	Faroe Islands	24	(101)
Medal record
U21 World Championship
Bronze medal – third place	2025 Poland
- Updated on 11 January 2026

Óli Mittún (born 10 June 2005) is a Faroese handball player for GOG Håndbold and the Faroese national team.

He participated at the 2022 European U-18 Championship, 2022 European U-20 Championship and the 2023 World U-19 Championship.

He was part of the Faroese team at their first ever major international tournament; the 2024 European Men's Handball Championship. They did however exit in the preliminary round after 3 defeats.

At the 2026 European Men's Handball Championship he was part of the Faroese team that won their first ever match at a major international tournament, when they won 37–24 against Montenegro.

== Honours ==
- Swedish Handball League
  - Winner: 2024
  - Runner-up: 2023

Individual awards

- MVP at the 2022 European U-18 Championship
- Top scorer at the 2022 European U-18 Championship (80 goals)
- All-Star Team as Best centre back at the 2023 World U-19 Championship
- Top scorer at the 2023 World U-19 Championship (87 goals)
- Top scorer at the 2024 European U-20 Championship (76 goals)
- MVP of Handbollsligan 2024/2025
- MVP at the 2025 U21 World Championship
- Top scorer at the 2025 World U21 Championship (73 goals)

== Personal life ==
He is the cousin of handball playing brothers Elias and Rói Ellefsen á Skipagøtu. His older brother Pauli Mittún and older sister Jana Mittún are also handball players. Through their mothers, the Mittún and Ellefsen á Skipagøtu siblings are grandchildren of former Faroese prime minister Pauli Ellefsen.
