= Julio Baumann =

Chilean handball player (born 1998)

Personal information
- Full name: Julio Ignacio Baumann de la Barrera
- Born: 29 January 1998 (age 28) Los Ángeles, Chile
- Height: 1.85 m (6 ft 1 in)

Sport
- Sport: Handball
- Position: Centre back

Senior clubs
- Years: Team
- 2017–2018: UB Lavadores
- 2018–2019: CB Ovalle
- 2019–2020: CD Marienses
- 2020–2021: CAB Cartagena
National team
Years	Team	Apps	(Gls)
–	Chile	7	(1)
Medal record
SoCa. Junior Championship
Bronze medal – third place	2019 Colombia
Pan American Youth Championship
Bronze medal – third place	2017 Chile

Julio Ignacio Baumann de la Barrera (born 29 January 1998) is a Chilean handball player for the Chilean national team.

He represented Chile at the 2019 World Men's Handball Championship.
