= Rennosuke Tokuda =

Japanese handball player (born 1998)

Personal information
- Nationality: Japan
- Born: 15 May 1998 (age 27) Iwakuni, Japan
- Height: 1.80 m (5 ft 11 in)
- Weight: 82 kg (181 lb)

Sport
- Sport: Handball
- Club: Górnik Zabrze

Rennosuke Tokuda (born 15 May 1998) is a Japanese handball player on the right back position.

Since 2019 Tokuda is playing in Europe, first for SPR Tarnów as the first player from Japan in Poland. In the season 2020/21 he was the top scorer in the Polish Superliga. Mid-season 2021/22 he transferred to TuS Nettelstedt-Lübbecke in the HBL. In the summer that year he returned to the Superliga to Górnik Zabrze. For his national team he competed in the 2020 Summer Olympics and in the 2021 World Men's Handball Championship, where he played in all 6 matches for his side.
