= Oskar Sunnefeldt =

Swedish handball player (born 1998)

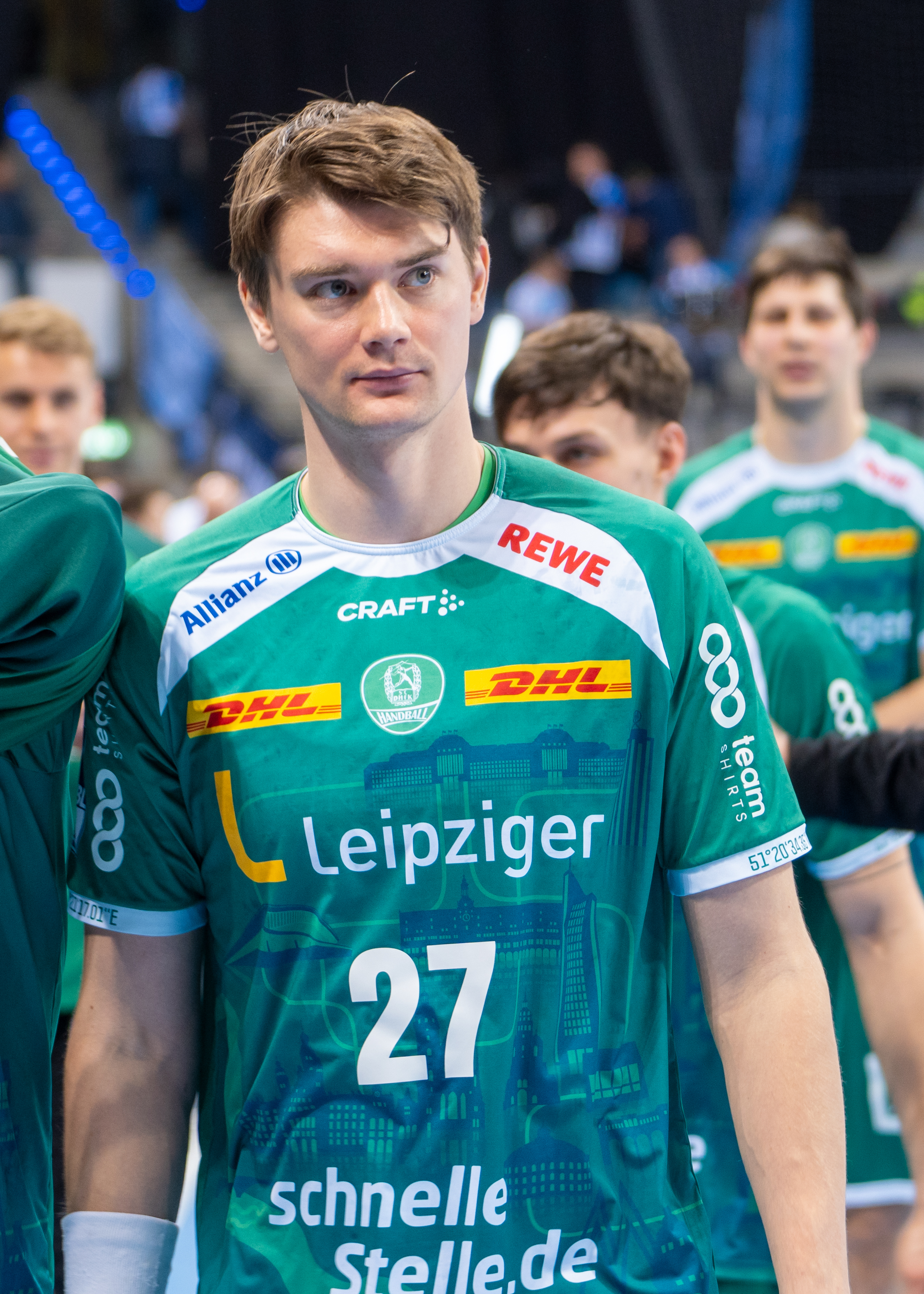
- Sunnefeldt in 2024

Personal information
- Full name: Oskar Fredrik Sunnefeldt
- Nationality: Swedish
- Born: 21 April 1998 (age 28) Mölndal, Sweden
- Height: 198 cm (78 in)

Sport
- Sport: Handball
- Position: Left back
- Current club: Frisch Auf Göppingen
- Number: 27

Senior clubs
- Years: Team
- 2016–2019: IK Sävehof
- 2019–2020: SønderjyskE Herrehåndbold
- 2020–2021: THW Kiel
- 2021–2024: SC DHfK Leipzig
- 2024–: Frisch Auf Göppingen
National team
Years	Team	Apps	(Gls)
2019–	Sweden	18	(14)
Medal record
World Championship
Silver medal – second place	2021 Egypt
- Updated on 2 August 2024

Oskar Sunnefeldt (born 21 April 1998 in Mölndal, Sweden) is a Swedish handball player who plays for the German club Frisch Auf Göppingen.

He represented Sweden at the 2021 World Men's Handball Championship in Egypt, where Sweden won silver medals losing to Denmark in the final.
