= Kristjan Horžen =

Slovenian handball player (born 1999)

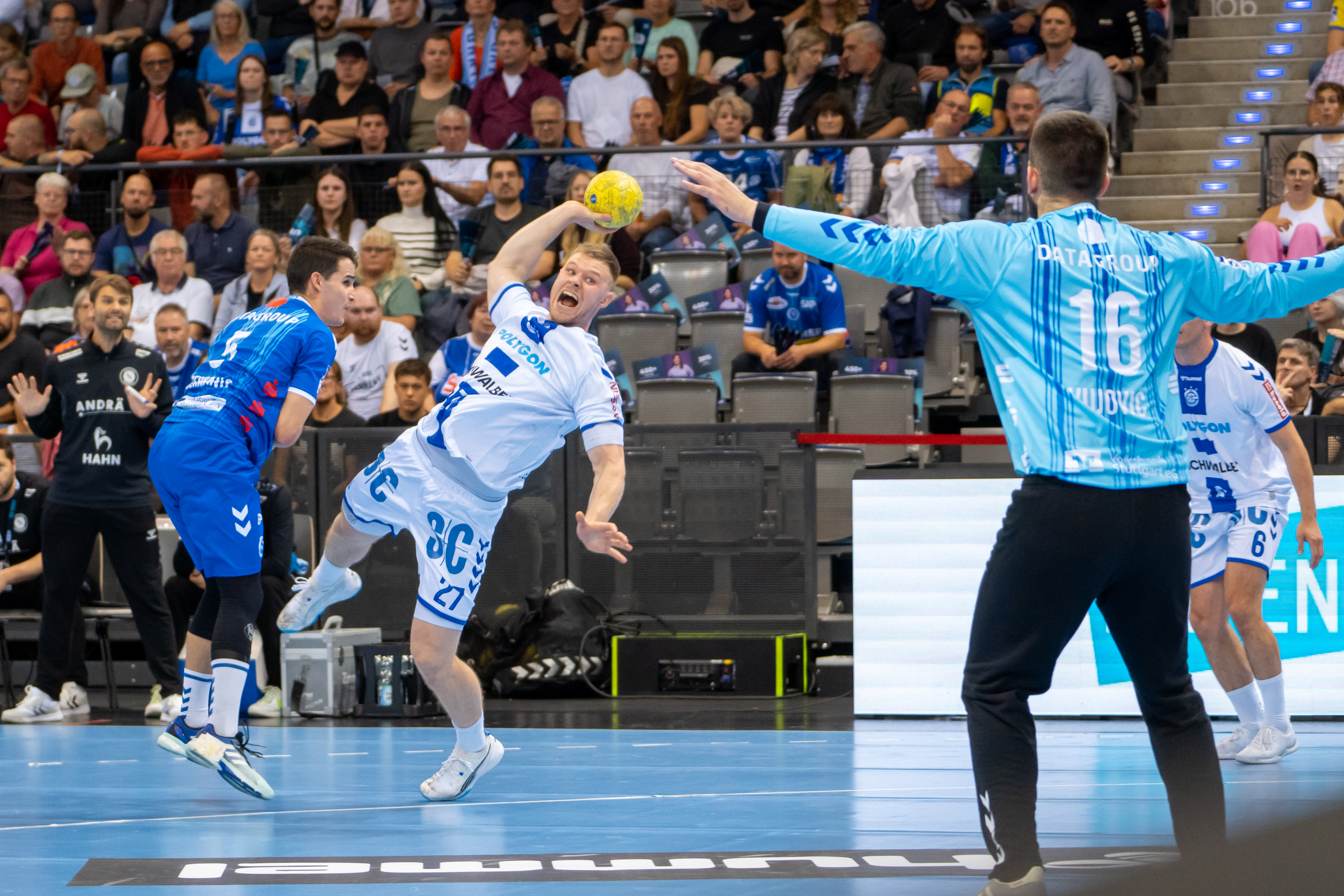
- Horžen in 2024

Personal information
- Nationality: Slovenian
- Born: 8 December 1999 (age 26) Novo Mesto, Slovenia
- Height: 1.92 m (6 ft 4 in)

Sport
- Sport: Handball
- Position: Pivot
- Current club: VfL Gummersbach
- Number: 27

Senior clubs
- Years: Team
- 2016–2018: RK Trimo Trebnje
- 2018–2021: RK Celje
- 2021–2023: Rhein-Neckar Löwen
- 2023–: VfL Gummersbach
National team
| Years | Team | Apps | (Gls) |
| 2020– | Slovenia | 72 | (115) |
- Updated on 24 January 2026

Kristjan Horžen (born 8 December 1999) is a Slovenian handball player who plays for VfL Gummersbach and the Slovenia national team. He represented Slovenia at the 2020 European Men's Handball Championship.
