= Croatia men's national youth handball team =

Croatia

Information
- Association: Croatian Handball Federation

Colours
1st	2nd

Results

IHF U-19 World Championship
- Appearances: 8 (First in 2007)
- Best result: (gold) Champions(2009)

European Youth Championship
- Appearances: 10 (First in 1999)
- Best result: (gold) Champions (2006, 2010)
- Last updated on Unknown.

The Croatia national youth handball team is the national under–18 handball team of Croatia. Controlled by the Croatian Handball Federation, it represents Croatia in international matches.

== Statistics ==
=== World Championship record ===
Year	Round	Position	GP	W	D*	L	GS	GA	GD
(Qatar) 2005	Third place	3rd place, bronze medalist(s)	6	4	0	2	184	175	+9
(Bahrain) 2007	Final	2nd place, silver medalist(s)	7	5	1	1	215	174	+41
(Tunisia) 2009	Final	1st place, gold medalist(s)	7	7	0	0	244	168	+76
(Argentina) 2011	Second Round	8th	7	2	1	4	186	189	-3
(Hungary) 2013	Final	2nd place, silver medalist(s)	9	8	0	1	276	233	+43
(Russia) 2015	Round of 16	14th	7	2	0	5	185	195	-10
(Georgia (country)) 2017	Fourth place	4th	9	6	1	3	274	240	+34
(North Macedonia) 2019	Round of 16	10th	7	5	1	1	226	166	+60
(Croatia) 2023	Third place	3rd place, bronze medalist(s)	8	6	1	1	184	175	+9
(Egypt) 2025	President's Cup	18th	8	4	1	3	258	231	+27
Total	10/10	1 Title	68	42	5	21	2048	1771	+277

== Acknowledgements ==
=== Individual ===
- Aleksandar Čaprić: best left back of the 2023 World Championship
- Domagoj Duvnjak: member of the all-star team of the 2007 World Championship
- Marko Mamić: best left back of the 2013 World Championship
- Marino Marić: best pivot of the 2009 World Championship
- Ivan Martinović: best right back of the 2017 World Championship
- Lovro Mihić: best left wing of the 2013 World Championship
- Manuel Štrlek: member of the all-star team of the 2007 World Championship
