= Sweden men's national youth handball team =

Sweden

Information
- Association: Swedish Handball Federation

Colours
1st	2nd

Results

IHF U-19 World Championship
- Appearances: 9 (First in 2007)
- Best result: 3rd (2007, 2009, 2011)

European Championship
- Appearances: 13 (First in 1994)
- Best result: Winner (1997, 2018, 2024)
- Last updated on Unknown.

The Sweden national youth handball team is the national under–18 handball team of Sweden. Controlled by the Swedish Handball Federation it represents Sweden in international matches.

== History ==
=== World Championship record ===
Year	Round	Position
Qatar 2005	Did not qualify	
Bahrain 2007	Semifinals	3rd
Tunisia 2009	Semifinals	3rd
Argentina 2011	Semifinals	3rd
Hungary 2013	Quarterfinals	6th
Russia 2015	Quarterfinals	5th
Georgia 2017	Quarterfinals	5th
North Macedonia 2019	Round of 16	11th
Croatia 2023	Preliminary round	17th
Egypt 2025	Semifinals	4th
Total		0 Titles

=== European Championship record ===
Year	Round	Position
Switzerland 1992	Did not qualify	
Israel 1994	Group stage	9th
Estonia 1997	Final Round	1st
Portugal 1999	Did not qualify	
Luxembourg 2001	Semi-finals	3rd
Slovakia 2003	Did not qualify	
Serbia and Montenegro 2004	Group stage	7th
Estonia 2006	Semi-finals	3rd
Czech Republic 2008	Semi-finals	3rd
Montenegro 2010	Group stage	7th
Austria 2012	Final	2nd
Poland 2014	Quarterfinals	5th
Croatia 2016	Group stage	9th
Croatia 2018	Final	1st
Montenegro 2022	Final	2nd
Montenegro 2024	Final	1st
Total		3 Titles
