= Norway men's national youth handball team =

Norway

Information
- Association: Norwegian Handball Federation

Colours
1st	2nd

Results

IHF U-19 World Championship
- Appearances: 7 (First in 2009)
- Best result: 5th place : (2013)

European Youth Championship
- Best result: 4th place : (1992)
- Last updated on Unknown.

The Norway national youth handball team is the national under-18 handball team of Norway. Controlled by the Norwegian Handball Federation, that is an affiliate of the International Handball Federation IHF as well as a member of the European Handball Federation EHF, The team represents Norway in international matches.

== Statistics ==
=== Youth Olympic Games ===
Champions Runners up Third place Fourth place

Youth Olympic Games record
Year	Round	Position	GP	W	D	L	GS	GA	GD
(Singapore) 2010	Didn't Qualify								
(China) 2014	Didn't Qualify								
(Argentina) 2018	No Handball Event								
(Senegal) 2022	No Handball Event								
Total	0 / 2	0 Titles							

=== World Championship record ===
Champions Runners up Third place Fourth place

Year	Round	Position	GP	W	D*	L	GS	GA	GD
(Qatar) 2005	Didn't Qualify								
(Bahrain) 2007	Didn't Qualify								
(Tunisia) 2009	Quarter-Finals	8th place							
(Argentina) 2011	Didn't Qualify								
(Hungary) 2013		5th place							
(Russia) 2015		6th place							
(Georgia (country)) 2017		17th place							
(North Macedonia) 2019		12th place							
(Croatia) 2023		7th place							
(Egypt) 2025		8th place							
Total	7/10	0 Titles							

=== EHF European Youth Championship ===
Champions Runners up Third place Fourth place

European Youth Championship record
Year	Round	Position	GP	W	D	L	GS	GA	GD
(Switzerland) 1992	Semi-finals	4th place							
(Israel) 1994	Didn't Qualify								
(Estonia) 1997	Didn't Qualify								
(Portugal) 1999		11th place							
(Luxembourg) 2001	Didn't Qualify								
(Slovakia) 2003	Didn't Qualify								
(Serbia and Montenegro) 2004	Didn't Qualify								
(Estonia) 2006	Didn't Qualify								
(Czech Republic) 2008		8th place							
(Montenegro) 2010		13th place							
(Austria) 2012		9th place							
(Poland) 2014	Didn't Qualify								
(Croatia) 2016	Intermediate Round	12th place							
(Croatia) 2018	Intermediate Round	11th place							
(Croatia) 2021	Intermediate Round	11th place							
(Montenegro) 2022	Main Round	7th place							
(Montenegro) 2024	Main Round	7th place							
(Serbia) 2026	Intermediate Round	18th place							
Total	11/18	0 Titles							
