= Portugal men's national youth handball team =

Portugal

Information
- Association: Portuguese Handball Federation

Colours
| 1st | 2nd |

Results

IHF U-19 World Championship
- Appearances: 4 (First in 2017)
- Best result: 4th place : (2019)

European Youth Championship
- Best result: (gold) Champions (1992)
- Last updated on Unknown.

The Portugal national youth handball team is the national under-18 handball team of Portugal. Controlled by the Portuguese Handball Federation, that is an affiliate of the International Handball Federation IHF as well as a member of the European Handball Federation EHF, The team represents Portugal in international matches.

== Youth Olympic Games ==
Champions Runners up Third place Fourth place

Youth Olympic Games record
| Year | Round | Position | GP | W | D | L | GS | GA | GD |
|---|---|---|---|---|---|---|---|---|---|
| (Singapore) 2010 | Didn't Qualify | | | | | | | | |
| (China) 2014 | Didn't Qualify | | | | | | | | |
| (Argentina) 2018 | No Handball Event | | | | | | | | |
| (Senegal) 2022 | No Handball Event | | | | | | | | |
| Total | 0 / 2 | 0 Titles | | | | | | | |

=== World Championship record ===
Champions Runners up Third place Fourth place

| Year | Round | Position | GP | W | D* | L | GS | GA | GD |
|---|---|---|---|---|---|---|---|---|---|
| (Qatar) 2005 | Didn't Qualify | | | | | | | | |
| (Bahrain) 2007 | Didn't Qualify | | | | | | | | |
| (Tunisia) 2009 | Didn't Qualify | | | | | | | | |
| (Argentina) 2011 | Didn't Qualify | | | | | | | | |
| (Hungary) 2013 | Didn't Qualify | | | | | | | | |
| (Russia) 2015 | Didn't Qualify | | | | | | | | |
| (Georgia (country)) 2017 | Quarter-Finals | 7th place | | | | | | | |
| (North Macedonia) 2019 | Semi-Finals | 4th place | | | | | | | |
| (Croatia) 2023 | | 6th place | | | | | | | |
| (Egypt) 2025 | | 17th place | | | | | | | |
| Total | 4/10 | 0 Titles | | | | | | | |

=== EHF European Youth Championship ===
Champions Runners up Third place Fourth place

European Youth Championship record
| Year | Round | Position | GP | W | D | L | GS | GA | GD |
|---|---|---|---|---|---|---|---|---|---|
| (Switzerland) 1992 | Final | Champions | | | | | | | |
| (Israel) 1994 | Final | Runners-Up | | | | | | | |
| (Estonia) 1997 | Didn't Qualify | | | | | | | | |
| (Portugal) 1999 | | 8th place | | | | | | | |
| (Luxembourg) 2001 | Didn't Qualify | | | | | | | | |
| (Slovakia) 2003 | | 7th place | | | | | | | |
| (Serbia and Montenegro) 2004 | Didn't Qualify | | | | | | | | |
| (Estonia) 2006 | Didn't Qualify | | | | | | | | |
| (Czech Republic) 2008 | Didn't Qualify | | | | | | | | |
| (Montenegro) 2010 | | 14th place | | | | | | | |
| (Austria) 2012 | Didn't Qualify | | | | | | | | |
| (Poland) 2014 | Didn't Qualify | | | | | | | | |
| (Croatia) 2016 | Intermediate Round | 10th place | | | | | | | |
| (Croatia) 2018 | Intermediate Round | 12th place | | | | | | | |
| (Croatia) 2021 | Main Round | 6th place | | | | | | | |
| (Montenegro) 2022 | Main Round | 8th place | | | | | | | |
| (Montenegro) 2024 | Intermediate Round | 10th place | | | | | | | |
| (Serbia) 2026 | Main Round | 11th place | | | | | | | |
| Total | 11/18 | 1 Title | | | | | | | |
