= 2021 Men's Youth World Handball Championship =

Cancelled handball tournament

Tournament details
- Host country: Greece
- Dates: Cancelled
- Teams: 32 (from 6 confederations)

The 2021 IHF Men's Youth World Championship would have been ninth edition of the championship to be held from 18 to 29 August 2021 in Greece under the aegis of International Handball Federation (IHF). It would have been the first time in history that the championship would have been organised by Hellenic Handball Federation.

On 22 February 2021, the tournament was cancelled due to the COVID-19 pandemic.

== Qualification ==
Event	Host	Dates	Vacancies	Qualified
XXXVI IHF Congress	(Turkey) Antalya	11 November 2017	1	Greece
2020 Asian Men's Youth Handball Championship	(Kazakhstan) Almaty	5–17 June 2021	5	
2021 European Men's U-18 Handball Championship	Slovenia	TBD	14	
2020 African Men's Youth Handball Championship	(Morocco) Casablanca	14–21 March 2021	5	
2021 South and Central American Men's Youth Handball Championship		April/May 2021	3	
2021 North America and Caribbean Men's Youth Handball Championship		April/May 2021	2	
2021 IHF Trophy Oceania Continental Phase		April/May 2021	1	
2021 IHF Inter-Continental Trophy		April/May 2021	1	
