= 2026 European Men's U-20 Handball Championship =

15th edition of the European Men's Under-20 Handball Championship

Campionatul European de Handbal Masculin pentru Tineret din 2026 (in Romanian)

Tournament details
- Host country: Romania
- Venues: 3 (in 2 host cities)
- Dates: 8–19 July
- Teams: 24 (from 1 confederation)

Final positions
- Champions: Hungary (1st title)
- Runners-up: Sweden
- Third place: Slovenia
- Fourth place: Denmark

Tournament statistics
- Matches played: 96
- Goals scored: 6,091 (63.45 per match)
- Attendance: 23,950 (249 per match)
- Top scorer: (Latvia) Valdis Kalniņš (104 goals)

Awards
- Best player: (Sweden) Liam Hultberg

The 2026 European Men's U-20 Handball Championship, commonly referred to as the M20 EHF Euro 2026, was the 15th edition of the European Men's U-20 Handball Championship, the biennial international under-20 men's handball championship of Europe organized by EHF. It was hosted by Romania from 8 to 19 July 2026, marking the third time the event was held in the country, after 1996 and 2008. The final was in Cluj-Napoca.

24 teams participated for the second time, following the expansion in 2024. This tournament will act as a qualifier for the 2027 IHF Men's U21 Handball World Championship in North Macedonia, with 15 spots available.

Spain are the defending champions, having beaten Portugal in the 2024 final in Celje. Hungary won their first title after beating Sweden 34–32 at the BTarena.

== Bidding process ==
- Montenegro
- North Macedonia
- Romania
- Serbia
- Slovenia

On 13 December 2024, at a meeting in Vienna, the hosting rights were awarded to Romania. This will be the third time Romania hosts the tournament after 1996 and 2008.

== Format ==
The tournament consisted of three phases: The first two were played in a round-robin-groups format. The third phase was played in a playoff format with consolations.

In the First phase, 24 teams were drawn into six groups of four.

- The top two teams from each group advanced to the Main round.
- The third- and fourth-placed teams advanced to the Intermediate round.

In the Second phase, all teams were again divided into groups of four, but this time, against the teams that advanced to the same round as them. Each separate round (Main and Intermediate) was played by 12 teams, divided into three groups of four.

- In the Main round, the top two teams from each group and the best two third-placed teams advanced to the quarterfinals. The other four teams advanced to the 9th–16th place playoffs.
- In the Intermediate round, the winners of each group and the best second-placed team advanced to the 9th–16th place playoffs. The other eight teams advanced to the 17th–24th place playoffs.

In the Third phase, the teams were divided into three playoff tiers of eight teams each, with each team playing three more matches there. Each of the three playoffs consisted of four quarterfinals, two semifinals, two consolation semifinals, and four final placement matches.

The format changed from the previous edition. This new format was previously adopted in the 2025 women's under age European Championships.

== Venues ==
The venues will be in Cluj-Napoca and Turda.

2026 European Men's U-20 Handball Championship is located in Romania
Cluj-Napoca	Cluj-Napoca	Turda
BTarena	Horia Demian Sports Hall	TU Turda
Capacity: 10,000	Capacity: 2,525	Capacity: 3,183

== Draw ==
- 2026 European Men's U-20 Handball Championship – Draw
- Draw Live Stream

The draw was held on 24 February 2026 in Vienna.

Pot 1	Pot 2	Pot 3	Pot 4
Denmark; Spain; Germany; Hungary; Portugal; Sweden	Austria; Czech Republic; France; Italy; Switzerland; France	Croatia; Faroe Islands; Iceland; Norway; Slovenia; Serbia	Finland; Israel; North Macedonia; Montenegro; Poland; Turkey

== Preliminary round ==
=== Tiebreakers ===
In the group stages (preliminary and main rounds), teams are ranked according to points (2 points for a win, 1 point for a draw, 0 points for a loss). If two or more teams have the same number of points, the ranking will be determined as follows:

During the round matches

1. Superior goal difference from all group matches;
2. Higher number of goals scored in all group matches;
3. Alphabetical order.

After completion of the round matches

1. Highest number of points in matches between the teams directly involved;
2. Superior goal difference in matches between the teams directly involved;
3. Highest number of goals scored in matches between the teams directly involved;
4. Superior goal difference in all matches of the group;
5. Highest number of plus goals in all matches of the group;

If the ranking of one of these teams is determined, the above criteria are consecutively followed until the ranking of all teams is determined. If no ranking can be determined, a decision shall be obtained by EHF through drawing of lots.

=== Group A ===
Pos	Team	Pld	W	D	L	GF	GA	GD	Pts	Qualification
1	Germany	3	3	0	0	83	70	+13	6	Main round
2	France	3	2	0	1	91	87	+4	4	Main round
3	Portugal	3	1	0	2	89	75	+14	2	Intermediate round
4	Greece	3	0	0	3	67	98	−31	0	Intermediate round

Source: EHF
Rules for classification: 1) points; 2) head-to-head points; 3) head-to-head goal difference; 4) head-to-head number of goals scored; 5) Goal difference.

8 July 2026; 11:00	Portugal	39–21	Greece	BTarena, Cluj-Napoca; Attendance: 55; Referees: Petursson, Thrastarson (ISL)
8 July 2026; 11:00	Fernandes Anastácio 4	(20–9)	Rarakos 5	BTarena, Cluj-Napoca; Attendance: 55; Referees: Petursson, Thrastarson (ISL)
8 July 2026; 11:00	1× (yellow card) 5× (suspension)	Report	4× (suspension)	BTarena, Cluj-Napoca; Attendance: 55; Referees: Petursson, Thrastarson (ISL)

8 July 2026; 16:00	Germany	31–30	France	BTarena, Cluj-Napoca; Attendance: 130; Referees: Kull, Tint (EST)
8 July 2026; 16:00	Koschek, Ankermann 7	(16–15)	Peyrabout 6	BTarena, Cluj-Napoca; Attendance: 130; Referees: Kull, Tint (EST)
8 July 2026; 16:00	1× (yellow card) 4× (suspension)	Report	1× (yellow card) 5× (suspension)	BTarena, Cluj-Napoca; Attendance: 130; Referees: Kull, Tint (EST)

9 July 2026; 11:00	France	31–27	Greece	BTarena, Cluj-Napoca; Attendance: 71; Referees: Bocakova, Janosikova (SVK)
9 July 2026; 11:00	Thuillier 9	(14–10)	Saltiel 8	BTarena, Cluj-Napoca; Attendance: 71; Referees: Bocakova, Janosikova (SVK)
9 July 2026; 11:00	1× (yellow card) 1× (suspension)	Report	4× (suspension)	BTarena, Cluj-Napoca; Attendance: 71; Referees: Bocakova, Janosikova (SVK)

9 July 2026; 16:00	Germany	24–21	Portugal	BTarena, Cluj-Napoca; Attendance: 111; Referees: D. Loncar, Z. Loncar (CRO)
9 July 2026; 16:00	Koschek 5	(12–7)	Oliveira Vasconscelos 7	BTarena, Cluj-Napoca; Attendance: 111; Referees: D. Loncar, Z. Loncar (CRO)
9 July 2026; 16:00	2× (suspension)	Report	1× (yellow card) 4× (suspension)	BTarena, Cluj-Napoca; Attendance: 111; Referees: D. Loncar, Z. Loncar (CRO)

11 July 2026; 11:00	Greece	19–28	Germany	TU Turda, Turda; Attendance: 155; Referees: Bujupi, Bujupi (KOS)
11 July 2026; 11:00	Tsioumas 7	(9–14)	Koschek 5	TU Turda, Turda; Attendance: 155; Referees: Bujupi, Bujupi (KOS)
11 July 2026; 11:00	2× (suspension)	Report	1× (yellow card) 5× (suspension)	TU Turda, Turda; Attendance: 155; Referees: Bujupi, Bujupi (KOS)

11 July 2026; 16:00	Portugal	29–30	France	TU Turda, Turda; Attendance: 196; Referees: Fabryczny, Rawicki (POL)
11 July 2026; 16:00	Vasconelos Oliveira 7	(13–7)	Peyrabout, Felix-Andrieu 7	TU Turda, Turda; Attendance: 196; Referees: Fabryczny, Rawicki (POL)
11 July 2026; 16:00	5× (suspension)	Report	1× (yellow card) 6× (suspension) 1× (red card)	TU Turda, Turda; Attendance: 196; Referees: Fabryczny, Rawicki (POL)

=== Group B ===
Pos	Team	Pld	W	D	L	GF	GA	GD	Pts	Qualification
1	Switzerland	3	3	0	0	125	80	+45	6	Main round
2	Faroe Islands	3	1	0	2	86	96	−10	2 (Note: Faroe Islands 2 Pts, +11 GD; Serbia 2 Pts, 0 GD; Turkey 2 Pts, −11 GD.)	Main round
3	Serbia	3	1	0	2	94	100	−6	2	Intermediate round
4	Turkey	3	1	0	2	90	119	−29	2	Intermediate round

Source: EHF
Rules for classification: 1) points; 2) head-to-head points; 3) head-to-head goal difference; 4) head-to-head number of goals scored; 5) Goal difference.
Notes:

8 July 2026; 13:30	Switzerland	50–32	Turkey	BTarena, Cluj-Napoca; Attendance: 73; Referees: Budzak, Zahradnik (SVK)
8 July 2026; 13:30	Cuencas 11	(20–19)	Herseklioglu 8	BTarena, Cluj-Napoca; Attendance: 73; Referees: Budzak, Zahradnik (SVK)
8 July 2026; 13:30	5× (suspension)	Report	8× (suspension) 2× (red card)	BTarena, Cluj-Napoca; Attendance: 73; Referees: Budzak, Zahradnik (SVK)

8 July 2026; 18:30	Serbia	32–31	Faroe Islands	BTarena, Cluj-Napoca; Attendance: 198; Referees: Peretz, Schwartz (ISR)
8 July 2026; 18:30	Stankovic 12	(14–17)	Egholm 12	BTarena, Cluj-Napoca; Attendance: 198; Referees: Peretz, Schwartz (ISR)
8 July 2026; 18:30	1× (yellow card) 6× (suspension)	Report	1× (yellow card) 3× (suspension)	BTarena, Cluj-Napoca; Attendance: 198; Referees: Peretz, Schwartz (ISR)

9 July 2026; 13:30	Faroe Islands	40–28	Turkey	BTarena, Cluj-Napoca; Attendance: 159; Referees: Uhlir, Benus (CZE)
9 July 2026; 13:30	Egholm 8	(21–14)	Herseklioglu 9	BTarena, Cluj-Napoca; Attendance: 159; Referees: Uhlir, Benus (CZE)
9 July 2026; 13:30	1× (yellow card) 1× (suspension)	Report	1× (yellow card) 3× (suspension) 1× (red card)	BTarena, Cluj-Napoca; Attendance: 159; Referees: Uhlir, Benus (CZE)

9 July 2026; 18:30	Serbia	25–35	Switzerland	BTarena, Cluj-Napoca; Attendance: 123; Referees: Kull, Tint (EST)
9 July 2026; 18:30	Rakovic 6	(11–18)	Cuencas 12	BTarena, Cluj-Napoca; Attendance: 123; Referees: Kull, Tint (EST)
9 July 2026; 18:30	4× (suspension)	Report	1× (yellow card) 3× (suspension)	BTarena, Cluj-Napoca; Attendance: 123; Referees: Kull, Tint (EST)

11 July 2026; 18:30	Turkey	30–29	Serbia	TU Turda, Turda; Attendance: 178; Referees: Lemes, Sosa (URU)
11 July 2026; 18:30	Cuencas 8	(14–13)	Egholm 4	TU Turda, Turda; Attendance: 178; Referees: Lemes, Sosa (URU)
11 July 2026; 18:30	1× (yellow card) 5× (suspension)	Report	2× (suspension)	TU Turda, Turda; Attendance: 178; Referees: Lemes, Sosa (URU)

11 July 2026; 13:30	Switzerland	40–32	Faroe Islands	TU Turda, Turda; Attendance: 263; Referees: Petursson, Thrastarson (ISL)
11 July 2026; 13:30	Önel 9	(18–12)	Maksovic 5	TU Turda, Turda; Attendance: 263; Referees: Petursson, Thrastarson (ISL)
11 July 2026; 13:30	1× (yellow card) 4× (suspension) 1× (red card)	Report	1× (yellow card) 5× (suspension)	TU Turda, Turda; Attendance: 263; Referees: Petursson, Thrastarson (ISL)

=== Group C ===
Pos	Team	Pld	W	D	L	GF	GA	GD	Pts	Qualification
1	Spain	3	3	0	0	103	81	+22	6	Main round
2	Iceland	3	2	0	1	91	89	+2	4	Main round
3	Austria	3	1	0	2	93	92	+1	2	Intermediate round
4	Latvia	3	0	0	3	82	107	−25	0	Intermediate round

Source: EHF
Rules for classification: 1) points; 2) head-to-head points; 3) head-to-head goal difference; 4) head-to-head number of goals scored; 5) Goal difference.

8 July 2026; 11:00	Spain	38–25	Latvia	Horia Demian Sports Hall, Cluj-Napoca; Attendance: 71; Referees: Cazan, Suliman (ROM)
8 July 2026; 11:00	Martín Duque 10	(19–11)	Kalniņš 8	Horia Demian Sports Hall, Cluj-Napoca; Attendance: 71; Referees: Cazan, Suliman (ROM)
8 July 2026; 11:00	7× (suspension)	Report	4× (suspension)	Horia Demian Sports Hall, Cluj-Napoca; Attendance: 71; Referees: Cazan, Suliman (ROM)

8 July 2026; 16:00	Iceland	32–27	Austria	Horia Demian Sports Hall, Cluj-Napoca; Attendance: 150; Referees: Bujupi, Bujupi (KOS)
8 July 2026; 16:00	Erlingsson 7	(15–16)	Danhel, Tikvic 6	Horia Demian Sports Hall, Cluj-Napoca; Attendance: 150; Referees: Bujupi, Bujupi (KOS)
8 July 2026; 16:00	1× (suspension)	Report	1× (suspension)	Horia Demian Sports Hall, Cluj-Napoca; Attendance: 150; Referees: Bujupi, Bujupi (KOS)

9 July 2026; 11:00	Austria	38–28	Latvia	Horia Demian Sports Hall, Cluj-Napoca; Attendance: 150; Referees: Lemes, Sosa (URU)
9 July 2026; 11:00	Fritsch 9	(25–17)	Kalniņš, Valkovskis 8	Horia Demian Sports Hall, Cluj-Napoca; Attendance: 150; Referees: Lemes, Sosa (URU)
9 July 2026; 11:00	1× (yellow card) 6× (suspension)	Report	4× (suspension)	Horia Demian Sports Hall, Cluj-Napoca; Attendance: 150; Referees: Lemes, Sosa (URU)

9 July 2026; 16:00	Iceland	28–33	Spain	Horia Demian Sports Hall, Cluj-Napoca; Attendance: 103; Referees: Fotakidis, Kinatzidis (GRE)
9 July 2026; 16:00	Guðmundsson 12	(12–16)	four players 4	Horia Demian Sports Hall, Cluj-Napoca; Attendance: 103; Referees: Fotakidis, Kinatzidis (GRE)
9 July 2026; 16:00	1× (yellow card) 3× (suspension)	Report	2× (yellow card) 6× (suspension)	Horia Demian Sports Hall, Cluj-Napoca; Attendance: 103; Referees: Fotakidis, Kinatzidis (GRE)

11 July 2026; 11:00	Latvia	29–31	Iceland	BTarena, Cluj-Napoca; Attendance: 189; Referees: Heddid, Picot (FRA)
11 July 2026; 11:00	Kalniņš 14	(14–16)	Halldórsson, Erglingsson 7	BTarena, Cluj-Napoca; Attendance: 189; Referees: Heddid, Picot (FRA)
11 July 2026; 11:00	2× (suspension)	Report	5× (suspension)	BTarena, Cluj-Napoca; Attendance: 189; Referees: Heddid, Picot (FRA)

11 July 2026; 16:00	Spain	32–28	Austria	BTarena, Cluj-Napoca; Attendance: 231; Referees: Uhlir, Benus (CZE)
11 July 2026; 16:00	Fis 10	(17–13)	Maximilian 9	BTarena, Cluj-Napoca; Attendance: 231; Referees: Uhlir, Benus (CZE)
11 July 2026; 16:00	2× (suspension)	Report	2× (suspension)	BTarena, Cluj-Napoca; Attendance: 231; Referees: Uhlir, Benus (CZE)

=== Group D ===
Pos	Team	Pld	W	D	L	GF	GA	GD	Pts	Qualification
1	Denmark	3	3	0	0	104	80	+24	6	Main round
2	Croatia	3	2	0	1	97	98	−1	4	Main round
3	Norway	3	1	0	2	98	97	+1	2	Intermediate round
4	North Macedonia	3	0	0	3	80	104	−24	0	Intermediate round

Source: EHF
Rules for classification: 1) points; 2) head-to-head points; 3) head-to-head goal difference; 4) head-to-head number of goals scored; 5) Goal difference.

8 July 2026; 13:30	Norway	36–31	North Macedonia	BTarena, Cluj-Napoca; Attendance: 85; Referees: Heddid, Picot (FRA)
8 July 2026; 13:30	Steinsland 8	(18–14)	Popovski 7	BTarena, Cluj-Napoca; Attendance: 85; Referees: Heddid, Picot (FRA)
8 July 2026; 13:30	1× (yellow card) 6× (suspension)	Report	7× (suspension)	BTarena, Cluj-Napoca; Attendance: 85; Referees: Heddid, Picot (FRA)

8 July 2026; 18:30	Denmark	37–30	Croatia	BTarena, Cluj-Napoca; Attendance: 120; Referees: Uhlir, Benus (CZE)
8 July 2026; 18:30	Sunesen 9	(19–17)	Moslavac 6	BTarena, Cluj-Napoca; Attendance: 120; Referees: Uhlir, Benus (CZE)
8 July 2026; 18:30	6× (suspension) 1× (red card)	Report	1× (yellow card) 7× (suspension)	BTarena, Cluj-Napoca; Attendance: 120; Referees: Uhlir, Benus (CZE)

9 July 2026; 13:30	Croatia	34–29	North Macedonia	BTarena, Cluj-Napoca; Attendance: 55; Referees: Fabryczny, Rawicki (POL)
9 July 2026; 13:30	Šprem 8	(19–14)	Kaevski 7	BTarena, Cluj-Napoca; Attendance: 55; Referees: Fabryczny, Rawicki (POL)
9 July 2026; 13:30	3× (suspension)	Report	7× (suspension)	BTarena, Cluj-Napoca; Attendance: 55; Referees: Fabryczny, Rawicki (POL)

9 July 2026; 18:30	Denmark	33–30	Norway	BTarena, Cluj-Napoca; Attendance: 205; Referees: Peretz, Schwartz (ISR)
9 July 2026; 18:30	Langmack 8	(17–11)	Søberg 6	BTarena, Cluj-Napoca; Attendance: 205; Referees: Peretz, Schwartz (ISR)
9 July 2026; 18:30	2× (suspension)	Report	2× (yellow card) 2× (suspension)	BTarena, Cluj-Napoca; Attendance: 205; Referees: Peretz, Schwartz (ISR)

11 July 2026; 13:30	North Macedonia	20–34	Denmark	BTarena, Cluj-Napoca; Attendance: 147; Referees: Bockakova, Janiosikova (SVK)
11 July 2026; 13:30	Popovski 7	(8–15)	Jensen 5	BTarena, Cluj-Napoca; Attendance: 147; Referees: Bockakova, Janiosikova (SVK)
11 July 2026; 13:30	1× (yellow card) 7× (suspension) 2× (red card)	Report	4× (suspension)	BTarena, Cluj-Napoca; Attendance: 147; Referees: Bockakova, Janiosikova (SVK)

11 July 2026; 18:30	Norway	32–33	Croatia	BTarena, Cluj-Napoca; Attendance: 261; Referees: Cazan, Suliman (ROM)
11 July 2026; 18:30	Søberg 10	(15–16)	Hromin 10	BTarena, Cluj-Napoca; Attendance: 261; Referees: Cazan, Suliman (ROM)
11 July 2026; 18:30	1× (yellow card) 3× (suspension)	Report	6× (suspension)	BTarena, Cluj-Napoca; Attendance: 261; Referees: Cazan, Suliman (ROM)

=== Group E ===
Pos	Team	Pld	W	D	L	GF	GA	GD	Pts	Qualification
1	Sweden	3	3	0	0	124	83	+41	6	Main round
2	Romania	3	1	0	2	99	111	−12	2 (Note: Romania 2 Pts, +6 GD; Israel 2 Pts, +2 GD; Bosnia and Herzegovina 2 Pts, −8 GD.)	Main round
3	Israel	3	1	0	2	107	114	−7	2	Intermediate round
4	Bosnia and Herzegovina	3	1	0	2	93	115	−22	2	Intermediate round

Source: EHF
Rules for classification: 1) points; 2) head-to-head points; 3) head-to-head goal difference; 4) head-to-head number of goals scored; 5) Goal difference.
Notes:

8 July 2026; 11:00	Sweden	42–33	Israel	TU Turda, Turda; Attendance: 100; Referees: D. Loncar, Z. Loncar (CRO)
8 July 2026; 11:00	Hultberg 10	(17–16)	Sharon 8	TU Turda, Turda; Attendance: 100; Referees: D. Loncar, Z. Loncar (CRO)
8 July 2026; 11:00	4× (suspension)	Report	6× (suspension)	TU Turda, Turda; Attendance: 100; Referees: D. Loncar, Z. Loncar (CRO)

8 July 2026; 16:00	Romania	34–36	Bosnia and Herzegovina	TU Turda, Turda; Attendance: 650; Referees: Fotakidis, Kinatzidis (GRE)
8 July 2026; 16:00	Serban 7	(15–18)	Hadzimuhamedovic 10	TU Turda, Turda; Attendance: 650; Referees: Fotakidis, Kinatzidis (GRE)
8 July 2026; 16:00	1× (yellow card) 9× (suspension) 1× (red card)	Report	1× (yellow card) 8× (suspension)	TU Turda, Turda; Attendance: 650; Referees: Fotakidis, Kinatzidis (GRE)

9 July 2026; 11:00	Israel	43–33	Bosnia and Herzegovina	TU Turda, Turda; Attendance: 90; Referees: Budzak, Zahradnik (SVK)
9 July 2026; 11:00	Bibange 10	(23–18)	Hadzimuhamedovic 9	TU Turda, Turda; Attendance: 90; Referees: Budzak, Zahradnik (SVK)
9 July 2026; 11:00	4× (suspension)	Report	1× (yellow card) 8× (suspension) 2× (red card)	TU Turda, Turda; Attendance: 90; Referees: Budzak, Zahradnik (SVK)

9 July 2026; 16:00	Sweden	44–26	Romania	TU Turda, Turda; Attendance: 760; Referees: Heddid, Picot (FRA)
9 July 2026; 16:00	three players 5	(23–14)	Iluca 9	TU Turda, Turda; Attendance: 760; Referees: Heddid, Picot (FRA)
9 July 2026; 16:00	6× (suspension)	Report	5× (suspension)	TU Turda, Turda; Attendance: 760; Referees: Heddid, Picot (FRA)

11 July 2026; 11:00	Bosnia and Herzegovina	24–38	Sweden	Horia Demian Sports Hall, Cluj-Napoca; Attendance: 83; Referees: Kull, Tint (EST)
11 July 2026; 11:00	Salkicevic 9	(8–19)	four players 5	Horia Demian Sports Hall, Cluj-Napoca; Attendance: 83; Referees: Kull, Tint (EST)
11 July 2026; 11:00	3× (suspension)	Report	4× (suspension)	Horia Demian Sports Hall, Cluj-Napoca; Attendance: 83; Referees: Kull, Tint (EST)

11 July 2026; 16:00	Romania	39–31	Israel	Horia Demian Sports Hall, Cluj-Napoca; Attendance: 550; Referees: M. Ilevski, M. Ilevski (MKD)
11 July 2026; 16:00	Serban, Iluca 8	(17–16)	Ekstein 6	Horia Demian Sports Hall, Cluj-Napoca; Attendance: 550; Referees: M. Ilevski, M. Ilevski (MKD)
11 July 2026; 16:00	1× (yellow card) 3× (suspension)	Report	1× (yellow card) 6× (suspension)	Horia Demian Sports Hall, Cluj-Napoca; Attendance: 550; Referees: M. Ilevski, M. Ilevski (MKD)

=== Group F ===
Pos	Team	Pld	W	D	L	GF	GA	GD	Pts	Qualification
1	Hungary	3	3	0	0	99	88	+11	6	Main round
2	Slovenia	3	2	0	1	101	93	+8	4	Main round
3	Poland	3	1	0	2	97	99	−2	2	Intermediate round
4	Czech Republic	3	0	0	3	82	99	−17	0	Intermediate round

Source: EHF
Rules for classification: 1) points; 2) head-to-head points; 3) head-to-head goal difference; 4) head-to-head number of goals scored; 5) Goal difference.

8 July 2026; 13:30	Slovenia	40–34	Poland	TU Turda, Turda; Attendance: 60; Referees: Bocakova, Janosikova (SVK)
8 July 2026; 13:30	Anžic 15	(26–15)	Czertowicz 6	TU Turda, Turda; Attendance: 60; Referees: Bocakova, Janosikova (SVK)
8 July 2026; 13:30	9× (suspension) 1× (red card)	Report	4× (suspension)	TU Turda, Turda; Attendance: 60; Referees: Bocakova, Janosikova (SVK)

8 July 2026; 18:30	Hungary	34–29	Czech Republic	TU Turda, Turda; Attendance: 130; Referees: M. Ilievski, M. Ilievski (MKD)
8 July 2026; 18:30	Eklemovic 9	(15–14)	Jahoda 8	TU Turda, Turda; Attendance: 130; Referees: M. Ilievski, M. Ilievski (MKD)
8 July 2026; 18:30	3× (suspension)	Report	3× (suspension) 1× (red card)	TU Turda, Turda; Attendance: 130; Referees: M. Ilievski, M. Ilievski (MKD)

9 July 2026; 13:30	Czech Republic	22–30	Poland	TU Turda, Turda; Attendance: 100; Referees: Petursson, Thrastarson (ISL)
9 July 2026; 13:30	Baumruk 6	(11–13)	Stawicki 10	TU Turda, Turda; Attendance: 100; Referees: Petursson, Thrastarson (ISL)
9 July 2026; 13:30	7× (suspension)	Report	3× (suspension) 1× (red card)	TU Turda, Turda; Attendance: 100; Referees: Petursson, Thrastarson (ISL)

9 July 2026; 18:30	Hungary	28–26	Slovenia	TU Turda, Turda; Attendance: 300; Referees: Bujupi, Bujupi (KOS)
9 July 2026; 18:30	Eklemovic 7	(14–13)	Anžic 11	TU Turda, Turda; Attendance: 300; Referees: Bujupi, Bujupi (KOS)
9 July 2026; 18:30	4× (suspension)	Report	1× (yellow card) 3× (suspension)	TU Turda, Turda; Attendance: 300; Referees: Bujupi, Bujupi (KOS)

11 July 2026; 13:30	Slovenia	35–31	Czech Republic	Horia Demian Sports Hall, Cluj-Napoca; Attendance: 200; Referees: D. Loncar, Z. Loncar (CRO)
11 July 2026; 13:30	Begic 8	(16–17)	Kunert, Jahoda 7	Horia Demian Sports Hall, Cluj-Napoca; Attendance: 200; Referees: D. Loncar, Z. Loncar (CRO)
11 July 2026; 13:30	5× (suspension)	Report	6× (suspension)	Horia Demian Sports Hall, Cluj-Napoca; Attendance: 200; Referees: D. Loncar, Z. Loncar (CRO)

11 July 2026; 18:30	Poland	33–37	Hungary	Horia Demian Sports Hall, Cluj-Napoca; Attendance: 220; Referees: Fotakidis, Kinatzidis (GRE)
11 July 2026; 18:30	Czertowicz 10	(18–19)	Eklemović, Fazekas 7	Horia Demian Sports Hall, Cluj-Napoca; Attendance: 220; Referees: Fotakidis, Kinatzidis (GRE)
11 July 2026; 18:30	4× (suspension)	Report	4× (suspension)	Horia Demian Sports Hall, Cluj-Napoca; Attendance: 220; Referees: Fotakidis, Kinatzidis (GRE)

== Intermediate round ==
=== Group I ===
Pos	Team	Pld	W	D	L	GF	GA	GD	Pts	Qualification
1	Portugal	3	3	0	0	118	74	+44	6	9th–16th place playoffs
2	Greece	3	2	0	1	80	94	−14	4	17th–24th place playoffs
3	Turkey	3	1	0	2	84	101	−17	2	17th–24th place playoffs
4	Serbia	3	0	0	3	83	96	−13	0	17th–24th place playoffs

Source: EHF
Rules for classification: 1) points; 2) head-to-head points; 3) head-to-head goal difference; 4) head-to-head number of goals scored; 5) Goal difference.

13 July 2026; 11:00	Portugal	43–27	Turkey	Horia Demian Sports Hall, Cluj-Napoca; Attendance: 80; Referees: Ilievski, Ilievski (MKD)
13 July 2026; 11:00	da Costa 9	(17–11)	Süer 6	Horia Demian Sports Hall, Cluj-Napoca; Attendance: 80; Referees: Ilievski, Ilievski (MKD)
13 July 2026; 11:00	3× (suspension)	Report	1× (yellow card) 3× (suspension)	Horia Demian Sports Hall, Cluj-Napoca; Attendance: 80; Referees: Ilievski, Ilievski (MKD)

13 July 2026; 13:30	Greece	30–28	Serbia	Horia Demian Sports Hall, Cluj-Napoca; Attendance: 100; Referees: Uhlir, Benus (CZE)
13 July 2026; 13:30	Tapantzis, Tsioumas 5	(15–17)	Simic 5	Horia Demian Sports Hall, Cluj-Napoca; Attendance: 100; Referees: Uhlir, Benus (CZE)
13 July 2026; 13:30	2× (suspension)	Report	3× (suspension)	Horia Demian Sports Hall, Cluj-Napoca; Attendance: 100; Referees: Uhlir, Benus (CZE)

14 July 2026; 11:00	Turkey	27–29	Greece	Horia Demian Sports Hall, Cluj-Napoca; Attendance: 55; Referees: Heddid, Picot (FRA)
14 July 2026; 11:00	Özdemir 6	(13–13)	Rarakos 6	Horia Demian Sports Hall, Cluj-Napoca; Attendance: 55; Referees: Heddid, Picot (FRA)
14 July 2026; 11:00	6× (suspension) 1× (red card)	Report	1× (suspension)	Horia Demian Sports Hall, Cluj-Napoca; Attendance: 55; Referees: Heddid, Picot (FRA)

14 July 2026; 13:00	Serbia	26–36	Portugal	Horia Demian Sports Hall, Cluj-Napoca; Attendance: 72; Referees: D. Loncar, Z. Loncar (CRO)
14 July 2026; 13:00	Maksovic 7	(17–19)	Fernandes, Oliveira 6	Horia Demian Sports Hall, Cluj-Napoca; Attendance: 72; Referees: D. Loncar, Z. Loncar (CRO)
14 July 2026; 13:00	1× (suspension)	Report	4× (suspension)	Horia Demian Sports Hall, Cluj-Napoca; Attendance: 72; Referees: D. Loncar, Z. Loncar (CRO)

=== Group II ===
Pos	Team	Pld	W	D	L	GF	GA	GD	Pts	Qualification
1	Norway	3	2	0	1	107	97	+10	4 (Note: Norway 36–29 Austria)	9th–16th place playoffs
2	Austria	3	2	0	1	95	88	+7	4	9th–16th place playoffs
3	North Macedonia	3	1	0	2	90	95	−5	2 (Note: North Macedonia 35–31 Latvia)	17th–24th place playoffs
4	Latvia	3	1	0	2	96	108	−12	2	17th–24th place playoffs

Source: EHF
Rules for classification: 1) points; 2) head-to-head points; 3) head-to-head goal difference; 4) head-to-head number of goals scored; 5) Goal difference.
Notes:

13 July 2026; 11:00	Austria	28–24	North Macedonia	TU Turda, Turda; Attendance: 112; Referees: Loncar, Loncar (CRO)
13 July 2026; 11:00	Fritsch 7	(15–14)	Popovski, Mateski 6	TU Turda, Turda; Attendance: 112; Referees: Loncar, Loncar (CRO)
13 July 2026; 11:00	5× (suspension) 1× (red card)	Report	3× (suspension)	TU Turda, Turda; Attendance: 112; Referees: Loncar, Loncar (CRO)

13 July 2026; 13:30	Latvia	37–35	Norway	TU Turda, Turda; Attendance: 120; Referees: Cazan, Suliman (ROU)
13 July 2026; 13:30	Kalniņš 14	(20–21)	Søberg 12	TU Turda, Turda; Attendance: 120; Referees: Cazan, Suliman (ROU)
13 July 2026; 13:30	1× (yellow card) 4× (suspension) 1× (red card)	Report	3× (suspension)	TU Turda, Turda; Attendance: 120; Referees: Cazan, Suliman (ROU)

14 July 2026; 11:00	North Macedonia	35–31	Latvia	TU Turda, Turda; Attendance: 65; Referees: Peretz, Schwartz (ISR)
14 July 2026; 11:00	Lazov 9	(16–13)	Kalniņš 17	TU Turda, Turda; Attendance: 65; Referees: Peretz, Schwartz (ISR)
14 July 2026; 11:00	3× (suspension)	Report	2× (suspension)	TU Turda, Turda; Attendance: 65; Referees: Peretz, Schwartz (ISR)

14 July 2026; 13:30	Norway	36–29	Austria	TU Turda, Turda; Attendance: 105; Referees: Bocakova, Janosikova (SVK)
14 July 2026; 13:30	Steinsland 10	(16–14)	Danhel 10	TU Turda, Turda; Attendance: 105; Referees: Bocakova, Janosikova (SVK)
14 July 2026; 13:30	1× (yellow card) 3× (suspension)	Report	3× (suspension)	TU Turda, Turda; Attendance: 105; Referees: Bocakova, Janosikova (SVK)

=== Group III ===
Pos	Team	Pld	W	D	L	GF	GA	GD	Pts	Qualification
1	Israel	3	2	0	1	112	99	+13	4 (Note: Israel 2 Pts, +3 GD; Poland 2 Pts, 0 GD; Czech Republic 2 Pts, −3 GD.)	9th–16th place playoffs
2	Poland	3	2	0	1	95	90	+5	4	17th–24th place playoffs
3	Czech Republic	3	2	0	1	90	90	0	4	17th–24th place playoffs
4	Bosnia and Herzegovina	3	0	0	3	92	110	−18	0	17th–24th place playoffs

Source: EHF
Rules for classification: 1) points; 2) head-to-head points; 3) head-to-head goal difference; 4) head-to-head number of goals scored; 5) Goal difference.
Notes:

13 July 2026; 11:00	Israel	30–35	Czech Republic	BTarena, Cluj-Napoca; Attendance: 71; Referees: Bujupi, Bujupi (KOS)
13 July 2026; 11:00	three players 6	(13–18)	Kunert 7	BTarena, Cluj-Napoca; Attendance: 71; Referees: Bujupi, Bujupi (KOS)
13 July 2026; 11:00	3× (suspension)	Report	5× (suspension) 1× (red card)	BTarena, Cluj-Napoca; Attendance: 71; Referees: Bujupi, Bujupi (KOS)

13 July 2026; 13:30	Bosnia and Herzegovina	29–34	Poland	BTarena, Cluj-Napoca; Attendance: 125; Referees: Heddid, Picot (FRA)
13 July 2026; 13:30	Hadzimuhamedovic 11	(14–18)	Trzaskowski 10	BTarena, Cluj-Napoca; Attendance: 125; Referees: Heddid, Picot (FRA)
13 July 2026; 13:30	6× (suspension)	Report	4× (suspension)	BTarena, Cluj-Napoca; Attendance: 125; Referees: Heddid, Picot (FRA)

14 July 2026; 11:00	Czech Republic	33–30	Bosnia and Herzegovina	BTarena, Cluj-Napoca; Attendance: 67; Referees: Fotakidis, Kinatzidis (GRE)
14 July 2026; 11:00	Jahoda 7	(18–17)	Hadzimuhamedovic 10	BTarena, Cluj-Napoca; Attendance: 67; Referees: Fotakidis, Kinatzidis (GRE)
14 July 2026; 11:00	4× (suspension)	Report	1× (yellow card) 4× (suspension)	BTarena, Cluj-Napoca; Attendance: 67; Referees: Fotakidis, Kinatzidis (GRE)

14 July 2026; 13:30	Poland	31–39	Israel	BTarena, Cluj-Napoca; Attendance: 120; Referees: Cazan, Suliman (ROM)
14 July 2026; 13:30	Trzaskowski 7	(14–19)	Sharon 13	BTarena, Cluj-Napoca; Attendance: 120; Referees: Cazan, Suliman (ROM)
14 July 2026; 13:30	3× (suspension)	Report	4× (suspension) 1× (red card)	BTarena, Cluj-Napoca; Attendance: 120; Referees: Cazan, Suliman (ROM)

=== Ranking of second-placed teams ===
Pos	Grp	Team	Pld	W	D	L	GF	GA	GD	Pts	Qualification
1	II	Austria	3	2	0	1	95	88	+7	4	9th–16th place playoffs
2	III	Poland	3	2	0	1	95	90	+5	4	17th–24th place playoffs
3	I	Greece	3	2	0	1	80	94	−14	4	17th–24th place playoffs

Source: EHF
Rules for classification: 1) points; 2) goal difference; 3) number of goals scored.

== Main round ==
Points and goals gained in the preliminary group against teams that advanced were transferred to the main round.

=== Group I ===
Pos	Team	Pld	W	D	L	GF	GA	GD	Pts	Qualification
1	Germany	3	3	0	0	97	90	+7	6	Quarterfinals
2	Switzerland	3	2	0	1	99	81	+18	4	Quarterfinals
3	France	3	1	0	2	94	83	+11	2	Quarterfinals
4	Faroe Islands	3	0	0	3	76	112	−36	0	9th–16th place playoffs

Source: EHF
Rules for classification: 1) points; 2) head-to-head points; 3) head-to-head goal difference; 4) head-to-head number of goals scored; 5) Goal difference.

13 July 2026; 16:00	France	38–23	Faroe Islands	Horia Demian Sports Hall, Cluj-Napoca; Attendance: 185; Referees: Lemes, Sosa (URU)
13 July 2026; 16:00	Dupuy 5	(19–24)	Egholm 5	Horia Demian Sports Hall, Cluj-Napoca; Attendance: 185; Referees: Lemes, Sosa (URU)
13 July 2026; 16:00	2× (suspension)	Report	2× (suspension)	Horia Demian Sports Hall, Cluj-Napoca; Attendance: 185; Referees: Lemes, Sosa (URU)

13 July 2026; 18:30	Germany	32–30	Switzerland	Horia Demian Sports Hall, Cluj-Napoca; Attendance: 204; Referees: Fotakidis, Kinatzidis (GRE)
13 July 2026; 18:30	Ankermann 9	(15–15)	Cuencas 12	Horia Demian Sports Hall, Cluj-Napoca; Attendance: 204; Referees: Fotakidis, Kinatzidis (GRE)
13 July 2026; 18:30	1× (yellow card) 2× (suspension)	Report	2× (yellow card) 2× (suspension)	Horia Demian Sports Hall, Cluj-Napoca; Attendance: 204; Referees: Fotakidis, Kinatzidis (GRE)

14 July 2026; 16:00	Switzerland	29–26	France	Horia Demian Sports Hall, Cluj-Napoca; Attendance: 106; Referees: M. Ilievski, M. Ilievski (MKD)
14 July 2026; 16:00	Heinl 8	(14–10)	Martiano-Kremer 7	Horia Demian Sports Hall, Cluj-Napoca; Attendance: 106; Referees: M. Ilievski, M. Ilievski (MKD)
14 July 2026; 16:00	1× (yellow card) 3× (suspension)	Report	2× (yellow card) 3× (suspension)	Horia Demian Sports Hall, Cluj-Napoca; Attendance: 106; Referees: M. Ilievski, M. Ilievski (MKD)

14 July 2026; 18:30	Faroe Islands	30–34	Germany	Horia Demian Sports Hall, Cluj-Napoca; Attendance: 250; Referees: Budzak, Zahradnik (SVK)
14 July 2026; 18:30	Egholm 11	(17–19)	Koschek 7	Horia Demian Sports Hall, Cluj-Napoca; Attendance: 250; Referees: Budzak, Zahradnik (SVK)
14 July 2026; 18:30	2× (suspension) 1× (red card)	Report	2× (yellow card) 5× (suspension)	Horia Demian Sports Hall, Cluj-Napoca; Attendance: 250; Referees: Budzak, Zahradnik (SVK)

=== Group II ===
Pos	Team	Pld	W	D	L	GF	GA	GD	Pts	Qualification
1	Spain	3	3	0	0	87	78	+9	6	Quarterfinals
2	Denmark	3	2	0	1	92	84	+8	4	Quarterfinals
3	Croatia	3	1	0	2	82	91	−9	2	9th–16th place playoffs
4	Iceland	3	0	0	3	82	90	−8	0	9th–16th place playoffs

Source: EHF
Rules for classification: 1) points; 2) head-to-head points; 3) head-to-head goal difference; 4) head-to-head number of goals scored; 5) Goal difference.

13 July 2026; 16:00	Iceland	25–26	Croatia	TU Turda, Turda; Attendance: 95; Referees: Peretz, Schwartz (ISR)
13 July 2026; 16:00	Erlingsson 6	(13–12)	Šprem 6	TU Turda, Turda; Attendance: 95; Referees: Peretz, Schwartz (ISR)
13 July 2026; 16:00	3× (suspension)	Report	1× (yellow card) 2× (suspension)	TU Turda, Turda; Attendance: 95; Referees: Peretz, Schwartz (ISR)

13 July 2026; 18:30	Spain	25–24	Denmark	TU Turda, Turda; Attendance: 184; Referees: Budzak, Zahradnik (SVK)
13 July 2026; 18:30	Fis 10	(13–9)	Sunesen 6	TU Turda, Turda; Attendance: 184; Referees: Budzak, Zahradnik (SVK)
13 July 2026; 18:30	6× (suspension)	Report	4× (suspension)	TU Turda, Turda; Attendance: 184; Referees: Budzak, Zahradnik (SVK)

14 July 2026; 16:00	Denmark	31–29	Iceland	TU Turda, Turda; Attendance: 248; Referees: Fabryczny, Rawicki (POL)
14 July 2026; 16:00	Kristensen 7	(17–14)	Guðmundsson 9	TU Turda, Turda; Attendance: 248; Referees: Fabryczny, Rawicki (POL)
14 July 2026; 16:00	1× (yellow card) 3× (suspension)	Report	1× (yellow card) 2× (suspension)	TU Turda, Turda; Attendance: 248; Referees: Fabryczny, Rawicki (POL)

14 July 2026; 18:30	Croatia	26–29	Spain	TU Turda, Turda; Attendance: 100; Referees: Kull, Tint (EST)
14 July 2026; 18:30	Moslavac 7	(11–15)	Martín 5	TU Turda, Turda; Attendance: 100; Referees: Kull, Tint (EST)
14 July 2026; 18:30	5× (suspension)	Report	2× (suspension)	TU Turda, Turda; Attendance: 100; Referees: Kull, Tint (EST)

=== Group III ===
Pos	Team	Pld	W	D	L	GF	GA	GD	Pts	Qualification
1	Sweden	3	3	0	0	117	82	+35	6	Quarterfinals
2	Hungary	3	2	0	1	93	94	−1	4	Quarterfinals
3	Slovenia	3	1	0	2	111	93	+18	2	Quarterfinals
4	Romania (H)	3	0	0	3	86	138	−52	0	9th–16th place playoffs

Source: EHF
Rules for classification: 1) points; 2) head-to-head points; 3) head-to-head goal difference; 4) head-to-head number of goals scored; 5) Goal difference.
(H) Hosts

13 July 2026; 16:00	Romania	32–53	Slovenia	BTarena, Cluj-Napoca; Attendance: 1,226; Referees: Petursson, Thrastason (ISL)
13 July 2026; 16:00	Chinut, Zein 5	(18–28)	Štaleker 11	BTarena, Cluj-Napoca; Attendance: 1,226; Referees: Petursson, Thrastason (ISL)
13 July 2026; 16:00	2× (suspension)	Report	1× (yellow card) 4× (suspension)	BTarena, Cluj-Napoca; Attendance: 1,226; Referees: Petursson, Thrastason (ISL)

13 July 2026; 18:30	Sweden	40–24	Hungary	BTarena, Cluj-Napoca; Attendance: 311; Referees: Rawicki, Fabryczny (POL)
13 July 2026; 18:30	Hultberg 9	(18–12)	Eklemovic 10	BTarena, Cluj-Napoca; Attendance: 311; Referees: Rawicki, Fabryczny (POL)
13 July 2026; 18:30	5× (yellow card) 4× (suspension)	Report	2× (suspension)	BTarena, Cluj-Napoca; Attendance: 311; Referees: Rawicki, Fabryczny (POL)

14 July 2026; 16:00	Slovenia	32–33	Sweden	BTarena, Cluj-Napoca; Attendance: 412; Referees: Uhlir, Benus (CZE)
14 July 2026; 16:00	Begic 8	(14–17)	Fredriksson 7	BTarena, Cluj-Napoca; Attendance: 412; Referees: Uhlir, Benus (CZE)
14 July 2026; 16:00	1× (yellow card) 4× (suspension)	Report	6× (suspension)	BTarena, Cluj-Napoca; Attendance: 412; Referees: Uhlir, Benus (CZE)

14 July 2026; 18:30	Hungary	41–28	Romania	BTarena, Cluj-Napoca; Attendance: 1,826; Referees: Lemes, Sosa (URU)
14 July 2026; 18:30	Gáncs-Pető 9	(20–13)	Chirut, Zeic 6	BTarena, Cluj-Napoca; Attendance: 1,826; Referees: Lemes, Sosa (URU)
14 July 2026; 18:30	3× (suspension)	Report	1× (yellow card) 4× (suspension)	BTarena, Cluj-Napoca; Attendance: 1,826; Referees: Lemes, Sosa (URU)

=== Ranking of third-placed teams ===
Pos	Grp	Team	Pld	W	D	L	GF	GA	GD	Pts	Qualification
1	III	Slovenia	3	1	0	2	111	93	+18	2	Quarterfinals
2	I	France	3	1	0	2	94	83	+11	2	Quarterfinals
3	II	Croatia	3	1	0	2	82	91	−9	2	9th–16th place playoffs

Source: EHF
Rules for classification: 1) points; 2) goal difference; 3) number of goals scored.

== 17th–24th place playoffs ==
21th place match
Bosnia and Herzegovina	23
Czech Republic	29
23th place match
Turkey (Pen.)	31 (4)
Greece	31 (3)

21–24 place semifinals
Bosnia and Herzegovina	38
Turkey	33
Greece	26
Czech Republic	27

17th–24th place quarterfinals
1	Poland (Pen.)	25 (5)
8	Bosnia and Herzegovina	25 (4)
3	North Macedonia	41
6	Turkey	24
4	Greece	28
5	Serbia	32
2	Czech Republic	34
7	Latvia	40

17th–20th place semifinals
Poland	33
North Macedonia	32
Serbia	37
Latvia	40

17th place match
Poland	36
Latvia	37
19th place match
North Macedonia	30
Serbia	34

=== 17th–24th place quarterfinals ===
16 July 2026
11:00
Poland
30–29 (Pen.)
Bosnia and Herzegovina
Horia Demian Sports Hall, Cluj-Napoca
Attendance: 40
Referees: Peretz, Schwartz (ISR)
Czertowicz, Trzaskowski 6
(12–11)
Hadzimuhamedovic 7
1× (yellow card) 3× (suspension)
Report
2× (yellow card)

FT: 25–25 Pen: 5–4

16 July 2026; 13:30	North Macedonia	41–24	Turkey	Horia Demian Sports Hall, Cluj-Napoca; Attendance: 30; Referees: Bocakova, Janosikova (SVK)
16 July 2026; 13:30	Lazov 9	(20–11)	Ayyildiz 5	Horia Demian Sports Hall, Cluj-Napoca; Attendance: 30; Referees: Bocakova, Janosikova (SVK)
16 July 2026; 13:30	2× (suspension)	Report		Horia Demian Sports Hall, Cluj-Napoca; Attendance: 30; Referees: Bocakova, Janosikova (SVK)

16 July 2026; 16:00	Greece	28–32	Serbia	Horia Demian Sports Hall, Cluj-Napoca; Attendance: 40; Referees: Rawicki, Fabryczny (POL)
16 July 2026; 16:00	Tsioumas 7	(17–15)	Pavlolic 9	Horia Demian Sports Hall, Cluj-Napoca; Attendance: 40; Referees: Rawicki, Fabryczny (POL)
16 July 2026; 16:00	4× (suspension)	Report	5× (suspension)	Horia Demian Sports Hall, Cluj-Napoca; Attendance: 40; Referees: Rawicki, Fabryczny (POL)

16 July 2026; 18:30	Czech Republic	34–40	Latvia	Horia Demian Sports Hall, Cluj-Napoca; Attendance: 50; Referees: Bujupi, Bujupi (KOS)
16 July 2026; 18:30	Jahoda 8	(17–20)	Kalniņš 12	Horia Demian Sports Hall, Cluj-Napoca; Attendance: 50; Referees: Bujupi, Bujupi (KOS)
16 July 2026; 18:30	1× (yellow card) 4× (suspension)	Report	2× (suspension)	Horia Demian Sports Hall, Cluj-Napoca; Attendance: 50; Referees: Bujupi, Bujupi (KOS)

=== 21st–24th place semifinals ===
17 July 2026; 11:00	Bosnia and Herzegovina	38–33	Turkey	Horia Demian Sports Hall, Cluj-Napoca; Attendance: 22; Referees: Cazan, Suliman (ROM)
17 July 2026; 11:00	Hadzimuhamedovic 11	(20–16)	Çakmak 6	Horia Demian Sports Hall, Cluj-Napoca; Attendance: 22; Referees: Cazan, Suliman (ROM)
17 July 2026; 11:00	3× (suspension)	Report	1× (yellow card) 3× (suspension)	Horia Demian Sports Hall, Cluj-Napoca; Attendance: 22; Referees: Cazan, Suliman (ROM)

17 July 2026; 16:00	Greece	26–27	Czech Republic	Horia Demian Sports Hall, Cluj-Napoca; Attendance: 74; Referees: D. Loncar, Z. Loncar (CRO)
17 July 2026; 16:00	Tsioumas 7	(13–15)	Mahušek 6	Horia Demian Sports Hall, Cluj-Napoca; Attendance: 74; Referees: D. Loncar, Z. Loncar (CRO)
17 July 2026; 16:00	4× (suspension)	Report	6× (suspension)	Horia Demian Sports Hall, Cluj-Napoca; Attendance: 74; Referees: D. Loncar, Z. Loncar (CRO)

=== 23rd place match ===
19 July 2026
8:30
Turkey
35−34 (Pen.)
Greece
TU Turda, Turda
Attendance: 161
Referees: Uhlir, Benus (CZE)
Herseklioğlu 12
(13–16)
Rarakos 9
4× (yellow card)
Report
1× (yellow card)

FT: 31−31 Pen: 4−3

=== 21st place match ===
19 July 2026; 8:30	Bosnia and Herzegovina	23–29	Czech Republic	Horia Demian Sports Hall, Cluj-Napoca; Attendance: 50; Referees: Bujupi, Bujupi (KOS)
19 July 2026; 8:30	Hadzimuhamedovic 8	(10–11)	Jahoda 5	Horia Demian Sports Hall, Cluj-Napoca; Attendance: 50; Referees: Bujupi, Bujupi (KOS)
19 July 2026; 8:30	4× (yellow card)	Report	4× (yellow card)	Horia Demian Sports Hall, Cluj-Napoca; Attendance: 50; Referees: Bujupi, Bujupi (KOS)

=== 17th–20th place semifinals ===
17 July 2026
13:30
Poland
33–32 (Pen.)
North Macedonia
Horia Demian Sports Hall, Cluj-Napoca
Attendance: 30
Referees: Lemes, Sosa (URU)
Trzaskowski 7
(15–16)
Krstevski 8
5× (suspension) 2× (red card)
Report
1× (yellow card) 4× (suspension)

FT: 28–28 Pen: 5–4

17 July 2026; 19:30	Serbia	37–40	Latvia	Horia Demian Sports Hall, Cluj-Napoca; Attendance: 55; Referees: Kull, Tint (EST)
17 July 2026; 19:30	Stankovic 14	(18–23)	Kalniņš 20	Horia Demian Sports Hall, Cluj-Napoca; Attendance: 55; Referees: Kull, Tint (EST)
17 July 2026; 19:30	1× (yellow card) 4× (suspension)	Report	7× (suspension)	Horia Demian Sports Hall, Cluj-Napoca; Attendance: 55; Referees: Kull, Tint (EST)

=== 19th place match ===
19 July 2026; 8:30	Poland	36–37	Latvia	BTarena Cluj-Napoca; Attendance: 79; Referees: Bocakova, Janosikova (SVK)
19 July 2026; 8:30	Trzaskowski 9	(17–19)	Kalniņš 11	BTarena Cluj-Napoca; Attendance: 79; Referees: Bocakova, Janosikova (SVK)
19 July 2026; 8:30	1× (yellow card) 3× (suspension)	Report	1× (yellow card) 2× (suspension)	BTarena Cluj-Napoca; Attendance: 79; Referees: Bocakova, Janosikova (SVK)

=== 17th place match ===
19 July 2026; 11:00	North Macedonia	30–34	Serbia	TD Turda, Turda; Attendance: 65; Referees: Peretz, Schwartz (ISR)
19 July 2026; 11:00	Krstevski 11	(12–20)	Stankovic 10	TD Turda, Turda; Attendance: 65; Referees: Peretz, Schwartz (ISR)
19 July 2026; 11:00	6× (suspension)	Report	2× (yellow card) 3× (suspension)	TD Turda, Turda; Attendance: 65; Referees: Peretz, Schwartz (ISR)

== 9th–16th place playoffs ==
13th place match
Iceland	39
Romania	26
15th place match
Israel	36
Croatia	31

13th–16th place semifinals
Iceland	35
Israel	23
Croatia	29
Romania	31

9th–16th place quarterfinals
Iceland	27
Norway	31
Faroe Islands	33
Israel	31
Croatia	25
Austria	30
Romania	34
Portugal	42

9th–12th place semifinals
Norway	37
Faroe Islands	32
Austria	28
Portugal	36

9th place match
Norway	35
Portugal	42
11rd place match
Faroe Islands	25
Austria	30

=== 9th–16 place quarterfinals ===
16 July 2026; 11:00	Iceland	27–31	Norway	TU Turda, Turda; Attendance: 123; Referees: Cazan, Suliman (ROM)
16 July 2026; 11:00	Bergþórsson, Guðmundsson 6	(14–12)	Langerød-Nilsen, Seierstad 7	TU Turda, Turda; Attendance: 123; Referees: Cazan, Suliman (ROM)
16 July 2026; 11:00	4× (suspension)	Report	1× (yellow card) 2× (suspension)	TU Turda, Turda; Attendance: 123; Referees: Cazan, Suliman (ROM)

16 July 2026; 11:00	Faroe Islands	33–31	Israel	BTarena, Cluj-Napoca; Attendance: 165; Referees: Uhlir, Benus (CZE)
16 July 2026; 11:00	Í Dímun 8	(15–17)	Ekstein 10	BTarena, Cluj-Napoca; Attendance: 165; Referees: Uhlir, Benus (CZE)
16 July 2026; 11:00	1× (yellow card) 2× (suspension)	Report	4× (suspension)	BTarena, Cluj-Napoca; Attendance: 165; Referees: Uhlir, Benus (CZE)

16 July 2026; 13:30	Croatia	25–30	Austria	TU Turda, Turda; Attendance: 80; Referees: M. Ilievski, M. Ilievski (MKD)
16 July 2026; 13:30	Šprem 8	(14–13)	Fritsch 9	TU Turda, Turda; Attendance: 80; Referees: M. Ilievski, M. Ilievski (MKD)
16 July 2026; 13:30	1× (yellow card) 4× (suspension)	Report	4× (suspension)	TU Turda, Turda; Attendance: 80; Referees: M. Ilievski, M. Ilievski (MKD)

16 July 2026; 13:30	Romania	34–42	Portugal	BTarena, Cluj-Napoca; Attendance: 246; Referees: Budzak, Zahradnik (SVK)
16 July 2026; 13:30	Dascalu 8	(21–18)	Oliveira 9	BTarena, Cluj-Napoca; Attendance: 246; Referees: Budzak, Zahradnik (SVK)
16 July 2026; 13:30	3× (suspension)	Report	2× (suspension)	BTarena, Cluj-Napoca; Attendance: 246; Referees: Budzak, Zahradnik (SVK)

=== 13–16th place semifinals ===
17 July 2026; 11:00	Iceland	35–23	Israel	TU Turda, Turda; Attendance: 78; Referees: Bujupi, Bujupi (KOS)
17 July 2026; 11:00	Hjartarson 7	(20–9)	Gross 5	TU Turda, Turda; Attendance: 78; Referees: Bujupi, Bujupi (KOS)
17 July 2026; 11:00	1× (suspension)	Report	1× (suspension)	TU Turda, Turda; Attendance: 78; Referees: Bujupi, Bujupi (KOS)

17 July 2026; 13:30	Croatia	29–31	Romania	TU Turda, Turda; Attendance: 452; Referees: Bocakova, Janosikova (SVK)
17 July 2026; 13:30	Moslavac 11	(12–14)	Dascalu 8	TU Turda, Turda; Attendance: 452; Referees: Bocakova, Janosikova (SVK)
17 July 2026; 13:30	1× (suspension)	Report	5× (suspension) 1× (red card)	TU Turda, Turda; Attendance: 452; Referees: Bocakova, Janosikova (SVK)

=== 15 place match ===
19 July 2026; 11:00	Croatia	31–36	Israel	Horia Demian Sports Hall, Cluj-Napoca; Attendance: 60; Referees: Heddid, Picot (FRA)
19 July 2026; 11:00	Moslavac 10	(17–14)	Resch Erman 11	Horia Demian Sports Hall, Cluj-Napoca; Attendance: 60; Referees: Heddid, Picot (FRA)
19 July 2026; 11:00	3× (suspension) 1× (red card)	Report	4× (suspension)	Horia Demian Sports Hall, Cluj-Napoca; Attendance: 60; Referees: Heddid, Picot (FRA)

=== 13 place match ===
19 July 2026; 13:30	Romania	26–39	Iceland	Horia Demian Sports Hall, Cluj-Napoca; Attendance: 250; Referees: M. Ilievski, M. Ilievski (MKD)
19 July 2026; 13:30	Serban 7	(10–21)	Hjartarson 7	Horia Demian Sports Hall, Cluj-Napoca; Attendance: 250; Referees: M. Ilievski, M. Ilievski (MKD)
19 July 2026; 13:30	1× (yellow card) 6× (suspension)	Report	2× (suspension)	Horia Demian Sports Hall, Cluj-Napoca; Attendance: 250; Referees: M. Ilievski, M. Ilievski (MKD)

=== 9th–12th place semifinals ===
17 July 2026; 11:00	Norway	37–32	Faroe Islands	BTarena, Cluj-Napoca; Attendance: 111; Referees: M. Ilevski, M. Ilevski (MKD)
17 July 2026; 11:00	Søberg 10	(16–14)	Egholm 8	BTarena, Cluj-Napoca; Attendance: 111; Referees: M. Ilevski, M. Ilevski (MKD)
17 July 2026; 11:00	1× (yellow card) 3× (suspension)	Report	2× (yellow card) 1× (suspension)	BTarena, Cluj-Napoca; Attendance: 111; Referees: M. Ilevski, M. Ilevski (MKD)

17 July 2026; 13:30	Austria	28–36	Portugal	BTarena, Cluj-Napoca; Attendance: 89; Referees: Peretz, Schwartz (ISR)
17 July 2026; 13:30	Tikvic 6	(12–15)	Oliveira 8	BTarena, Cluj-Napoca; Attendance: 89; Referees: Peretz, Schwartz (ISR)
17 July 2026; 13:30	1× (suspension)	Report	2× (suspension)	BTarena, Cluj-Napoca; Attendance: 89; Referees: Peretz, Schwartz (ISR)

=== 11th place match ===
19 July 2026; 13:30	Austria	30–25	Faroe Islands	TU Turda, Turda; Attendance: 67; Referees: D. Loncar, Z. Loncar (CRO)
19 July 2026; 13:30	Fritsch, Tikvic 7	(16–15)	Egholm 8	TU Turda, Turda; Attendance: 67; Referees: D. Loncar, Z. Loncar (CRO)
19 July 2026; 13:30	2× (suspension)	Report	2× (suspension)	TU Turda, Turda; Attendance: 67; Referees: D. Loncar, Z. Loncar (CRO)

=== 9th place match ===
19 July 2026; 11:00	Portugal	42–35	Norway	BTarena, Cluj-Napoca; Attendance: 89; Referees: Kull, Tint (EST)
19 July 2026; 11:00	Fernandes Anastácio 8	(22–16)	Bore 8	BTarena, Cluj-Napoca; Attendance: 89; Referees: Kull, Tint (EST)
19 July 2026; 11:00	4× (suspension)	Report	1× (yellow card) 2× (suspension)	BTarena, Cluj-Napoca; Attendance: 89; Referees: Kull, Tint (EST)

== Championship playoffs ==
5th place match
France	36
Germany	35
7th place match
Switzerland	29
Spain	33

5th–8th place semifinals
France	34
Switzerland	30
Spain	36
Germany	42

Quarterfinals
Sweden	39
France	28
Switzerland	28
Denmark	36
Spain	23
Slovenia	30
Germany	25
Hungary	27

Semifinals
Sweden	38
Denmark	35
Slovenia	24
Hungary	31

Final
Sweden	32
Hungary (ET)	34
3rd place match
Denmark	28
Slovenia	30

=== Quarterfinals ===
16 July 2026; 17:00	Sweden	39–28	France	BTarena, Cluj-Napoca; Attendance: 376; Referees: Petursson, Tharstarson (ISL)
16 July 2026; 17:00	Hultberg 7	(21–10)	Baradat, Ducap 5	BTarena, Cluj-Napoca; Attendance: 376; Referees: Petursson, Tharstarson (ISL)
16 July 2026; 17:00	5× (suspension) 1× (red card)	Report	1× (yellow card) 3× (suspension)	BTarena, Cluj-Napoca; Attendance: 376; Referees: Petursson, Tharstarson (ISL)

16 July 2026; 17:00	Switzerland	29–36	Denmark	TU Turda, Turda; Attendance: 402; Referees: Lemes, Sosa (URU)
16 July 2026; 17:00	Cuencas, Heinl 7	(14–16)	Kristensen 6	TU Turda, Turda; Attendance: 402; Referees: Lemes, Sosa (URU)
16 July 2026; 17:00	1× (yellow card) 5× (suspension)	Report	3× (suspension)	TU Turda, Turda; Attendance: 402; Referees: Lemes, Sosa (URU)

16 July 2026; 19:30	Spain	23–30	Slovenia	BTarena, Cluj-Napoca; Attendance: 792; Referees: Heddid, Picot (FRA)
16 July 2026; 19:30	Colón, Fis 4	(13–15)	Anžic 10	BTarena, Cluj-Napoca; Attendance: 792; Referees: Heddid, Picot (FRA)
16 July 2026; 19:30	6× (suspension) 1× (red card)	Report	7× (suspension)	BTarena, Cluj-Napoca; Attendance: 792; Referees: Heddid, Picot (FRA)

16 July 2026; 19:30	Germany	25–27	Hungary	TU Turda, Turda; Attendance: 348; Referees: Kull, Tint (EST)
16 July 2026; 19:30	Koschek 8	(13–15)	Fazekas 6	TU Turda, Turda; Attendance: 348; Referees: Kull, Tint (EST)
16 July 2026; 19:30	3× (suspension)	Report	4× (suspension)	TU Turda, Turda; Attendance: 348; Referees: Kull, Tint (EST)

=== 5th–8th place semifinals ===
17 July 2026; 17:00	France	34–30	Switzerland	TU Turda, Turda; Attendance: 213; Referees: Rawicki, Fabryczny (POL)
17 July 2026; 17:00	Triau-Betare 7	(19–17)	Heinl 7	TU Turda, Turda; Attendance: 213; Referees: Rawicki, Fabryczny (POL)
17 July 2026; 17:00	5× (suspension)	Report	1× (yellow card) 3× (suspension)	TU Turda, Turda; Attendance: 213; Referees: Rawicki, Fabryczny (POL)

17 July 2026; 19:30	Spain	36–42	Germany	TU Turda, Turda; Attendance: 347; Referees: Petursson, Thrastarson (ISL)
17 July 2026; 19:30	Martín Duque 7	(17–19)	Hein 9	TU Turda, Turda; Attendance: 347; Referees: Petursson, Thrastarson (ISL)
17 July 2026; 19:30	2× (suspension)	Report	2× (suspension)	TU Turda, Turda; Attendance: 347; Referees: Petursson, Thrastarson (ISL)

=== 7th place match ===
19 July 2026; 17:00	Switzerland	29–33	Spain	BTarena, Cluj-Napoca; Attendance: 150; Referees: Cazin, Suliman (ROM)
19 July 2026; 17:00	Cuencas 7	(20–16)	Fis 9	BTarena, Cluj-Napoca; Attendance: 150; Referees: Cazin, Suliman (ROM)
19 July 2026; 17:00	2× (yellow card)	Report	1× (yellow card) 4× (suspension)	BTarena, Cluj-Napoca; Attendance: 150; Referees: Cazin, Suliman (ROM)

=== 5th place match ===
19 July 2026
14:30
France
36–35 (Pen.)
Germany
BTarena, Cluj-Napoca
Attendance: 345
Referees: Lemes, Sosa (URU)
Thuillier 10
(17–12)
Willax 7
2× (suspension)
Report
1× (yellow card) 3× (suspension)

FT: 32–32 Pen: 4–3

=== Semifinals ===
17 July 2026; 17:00	Sweden	38–35	Denmark	BTarena, Cluj-Napoca; Attendance: 873; Referees: Fotakidis, Kinatzidis (GRE)
17 July 2026; 17:00	Hultberg 10	(17–14)	Kristensen, Langmack 7	BTarena, Cluj-Napoca; Attendance: 873; Referees: Fotakidis, Kinatzidis (GRE)
17 July 2026; 17:00	2× (yellow card) 7× (suspension)	Report	2× (yellow card) 4× (suspension)	BTarena, Cluj-Napoca; Attendance: 873; Referees: Fotakidis, Kinatzidis (GRE)

17 July 2026; 19:30	Slovenia	24–31	Hungary	BTarena, Cluj-Napoca; Attendance: 999; Referees: Budzak, Zahradnik (SVK)
17 July 2026; 19:30	Štaleker 13	(11–15)	Fazekas 7	BTarena, Cluj-Napoca; Attendance: 999; Referees: Budzak, Zahradnik (SVK)
17 July 2026; 19:30	1× (yellow card)	Report	1× (yellow card) 1× (suspension)	BTarena, Cluj-Napoca; Attendance: 999; Referees: Budzak, Zahradnik (SVK)

=== Third place game ===
19 July 2024; 16:00	Denmark	28–30	Slovenia	BTarena, Cluj-Napoca; Attendance: 1,562; Referees: Petursson, Tharstarsson (ISL)
19 July 2024; 16:00	Sunesen 6	(10–15)	Anžic 9	BTarena, Cluj-Napoca; Attendance: 1,562; Referees: Petursson, Tharstarsson (ISL)
19 July 2024; 16:00	3× (yellow card)	Report	3× (yellow card)	BTarena, Cluj-Napoca; Attendance: 1,562; Referees: Petursson, Tharstarsson (ISL)

=== Final ===
19 July 2024
18:30
Sweden
32–34 (ET)
Hungary
BTarena, Cluj-Napoca
Attendance: 2,026
Referees: Fabryczny, Rawicki (POL)
Fredriksson 9
(16–15)
Gazsó 14

Report
3× (suspension)

FT: 28–28 ET: 4–6

== Final ranking ==
Rank	Team
1st place, gold medalist(s)	Hungary
2nd place, silver medalist(s)	Sweden
3rd place, bronze medalist(s)	Slovenia
4	Denmark
5	France
6	Germany
7	Spain
8	Switzerland
9	Portugal
10	Norway
11	Austria
12	Faroe Islands
13	Iceland
14	Romania
15	Israel
16	Croatia
17	Latvia
18	Poland
19	Serbia
20	North Macedonia
21	Czech Republic
22	Bosnia and Herzegovina
23	Turkey
24	Greece

2026 European Men's U-20 Handball Championship

Hungary
First title

Team roster: László Várady-Szabó, Ádám Kristóf Balogh, Péter Gazsó, Koppany Pinter, Máté Kucsera, Máté Mészáros, Máté Fazekas, Máté Gáncs-Pető, Márkó Eklemovic, Dávid Horváth, Ádám Horváth-Garaba, Botond Apró, Péter Vincze, Márton Furka, Zalán Zakor, Zsombor Szujó.
Head Coach: László Sótonyi

=== All Star Team ===
The all-star team was announced on 19 July 2026.

Position	Player
Most valuable player	(Sweden) Liam Hultberg
Best defender	(Hungary) Máté Mészáros
Goalkeeper	(Sweden) Viggo Håkansson
Right wing	(Sweden) Alfred Arnelin
Right back	(Sweden) Måns Fredriksson
Centre back	(Hungary) Márkó Eklemovic
Pivot	(Sweden) Arvid Andreasson
Left back	(Slovenia) Aljuš Anžic
Left wing	(Denmark) Simon Sejer Kristensen
Top scorer	(Latvia) Valdis Kalniņš

2026 Men’s U-20 EHF Championship I

Rank	Team
1st place, gold medalist(s)	Netherlands
2nd place, silver medalist(s)	Estonia
3rd place, bronze medalist(s)	Kosovo
4	Italy
5	Georgia
6	Montenegro

2026 Men’s U-20 EHF Championship II

Rank	Team
1st place, gold medalist(s)	Finland
2nd place, silver medalist(s)	Slovakia
3rd place, bronze medalist(s)	Bulgaria
4	Belgium
5	Luxembourg
6	Great Britain

== Broadcasting rights ==
The television channels broadcasting the event is as follows:

Territory	Rights holder
Austria	Krone TV
Czech Republic	AMC
Denmark	SolidSport
Faroe Islands	Portal.fo
France	Handballtv.fr
Hungary	AMC
Iceland	SolidSport
Norway	SolidSport
Romania	ProTV
Slovakia	AMC
Slovenia	SolidSport
Sweden	SolidSport
Rest of Europe	EHFTV

=== Outside of Europe ===
Territory	Rights holder
Rest of World	EHFTV
