= Máté Gáncs-Pető =

Hungarian handball player (born 2007)

Personal information
- Nationality: Hungarian
- Born: 2 October 2007 (age 19) Veszprém, Hungary
- Height: 1.83 m (6 ft 0 in)

Sport
- Sport: Handball
- Position: Left wing
- Current club: ONE Veszprém
- Number: 66

Youth career
- Years: Team
- 2015–2017: DEVM Kézilabda Alapítvány Veszprém
- 2017–2025: Telekom Veszprém

Senior clubs
- Years: Team
- 2025–: (Hungary) ONE Veszprém
National team
Years	Team	Apps	(Gls)
2026–	Hungary	1	(0)
Medal record
Junior European Championship
Gold medal – first place	2026 Romania
European Youth Championship
Bronze medal – third place	2024 Montenegro

Máté Gáncs-Pető (born 2 October 2007) is a Hungarian handball player who plays for ONE Veszprém and the Hungarian national team.

== Career ==
=== Club ===
Máté started his career at DEVM Kézilabda Alapítvány Veszprém. He has been playing for the Telekom Veszprém team since 2017. Mété spent his first league seasons in the Veszprém youth system. From the 2024/2025 season, he was a member of the Nemzeti Bajnokság I/B BFKA-Veszprém with a double playing permit. He made his debut in the first team, Nemzeti Bajnokság I, on 7 February 2025: Dabas KK-Telekom Veszprém 24–48, scored 2 goals. In this 2024/2025 season, he played a total of 14 games in the first team, in which he scored 37 goals. He also made his EHF Champions League debut in February 2025: in the ONE Veszprém-Sporting CP 33-32 match.

=== National team ===
In 2024, he won a bronze medal at the Youth European Championship. The captain of the Hungarian national team, Chema Rodríguez, also noticed his performance, who invited him to practice with the national team from December 12 and December 17, 2025. He was 7th with the Hungarian team at the 2025 World Youth Championship. He was included in the large squad of the 2026 European Men's Handball Championship, but in the end he will not become a member of the narrow squad. He participated in the 2026 Junior European Championship, where Hungary won the gold medal. On 5 November 2026, he made his debut in the senior national team in Tatabánya in the Hungary-Montenegro men's European qualifying match 32-21.

== Honours ==
=== National team ===
- Junior European Championship:
  - Gold: 2026
- Youth European Championship:
  - Bronze: 2024

=== Club ===
ONE Veszprém

- IHF Super Globe
  - Gold: 2026
  - Silver: 2025
- Nemzeti Bajnokság I
  - Gold: 2025, 2026
- Magyar Kupa
  - Gold: 2026
  - Silver: 2025
- Hungarian Supercup
  - Gold: 2026

=== Individual ===
- Hungarian Youth Handball Player of the Year: 2025
