= 2024 European Men's U-18 Handball Championship =

14th edition of the European Men's U-18 Handball Championship

2024 European Men's U18 Handball Championship

Tournament details
- Host country: Montenegro
- City: Podgorica
- Venue(s): 2 (in 1 host city)
- Dates: 7–18 August 2024
- Teams: 24

Final positions
- Champions: Sweden (3rd title)
- Runners-up: Denmark
- Third place: Hungary
- Fourth place: Iceland

Tournament statistics
- Matches played: 96
- Top scorer(s): (Israel) Asaf Sharon (79 goals)

Awards
- Best player: (Sweden) Nikola Roganovic

Official website
- www.eurohandball.com

The 2024 European Men's U-18 Handball Championship was the 14th edition of the European Men's U-18 Handball Championship, held in Montenegro from 7 to 18 August 2024.

== Host selection ==
- Montenegro

On 31 March 2023, Montenegro was given the hosting rights.

== Expansion ==
At a meeting in Ljubljana, the EHF Executive Committee announced that they would analyse a possible expansion to 24 teams. On 17 June 2022, the EHF officially expanded the event to 24 teams.

== Format ==
In the first round, 24 teams are divided into 6 groups of 4:

- The six group winners plus the two best runner up (one from Groups A, B and C and one from Groups D, E and F) advance to the Main round.
- The four worst runners up and the four best third place teams (two from Groups A, B and C and two from Groups D, E and F) move on to the Intermediate round.
- The two worst third place teams (one from Groups A, B and C and one from Groups D, E and F) and all fourth place teams play in the Elimination round.

In the Second round, all teams are again split into 6 groups of 4, but this time, against the teams who advanced to the same round as them. Each separate phase (Main, Intermediate and Elimination) consist of eight teams and are split into 2 group of four.

- The teams in the Main round fight to win the championship.
- The teams in the Intermediate round play for rankings 9–16.
- The teams in the Elimination round play for positions 17–24 and to not get relegated.

Regarding the Main round, The top two from each group progresses to the semifinals, where the winners of the semifinals play for the title, while the two semifinal losers play for bronze.

== Qualification ==
To determine the extra spots, 20 teams competed in five separate qualifiers to decide the 10 teams advancing to the Euro.

Competition	Dates	Host	Vacancies	Qualified
Host nation	31 March 2023	(Turkey) Istanbul	1	Montenegro
Men's 18 EHF EURO 2022	4–14 August 2022	Montenegro	13	Spain; Sweden; Germany; Hungary; Croatia; Denmark; Hungary; Portugal; Faroe Islands; Iceland; Slovenia; Serbia; France
Qualifiers	5–7 January 2024	(Italy) Chieti	2	Greece; Italy
Qualifiers	5–7 January 2024	(North Macedonia) Skopje	2	Switzerland; North Macedonia
Qualifiers	5–7 January 2024	(Poland) Władysławowo	2	Poland; Israel
Qualifiers	5–7 January 2024	(Czech Republic) Zubří	2	Czech Republic; Ukraine
Qualifiers	5–7 January 2024	(Austria) Maria Enzersdorf	2	Austria; Romania

== Venues ==
The venues are in Podgorica.

2024 European Men's U-18 Handball Championship is located in Montenegro
Bemax Arena; Capacity: 2,244	Morača Sports Center; Capacity: 2,100	Verde Complex; Capacity: 6,000

== Draw ==
The draw was held on 29 February 2024 in Vienna at 15:00 (CET).

Pot 1	Pot 2	Pot 3	Pot 4
Spain; Germany; Sweden; Croatia; Denmark; Iceland	Hungary; Slovenia; Montenegro; Portugal; Norway; France	Serbia; Faroe Islands; Poland; Czech Republic; Switzerland; Austria	Greece; North Macedonia; Romania; Israel; Ukraine; Italy

== Preliminary round ==
=== Group A ===
Pos	Team	Pld	W	D	L	GF	GA	GD	Pts	Qualification
1	Serbia	3	3	0	0	102	98	+4	6	Main round
2	Croatia	3	2	0	1	96	83	+13	4	Intermediate round
3	Slovenia	3	1	0	2	94	98	−4	2	Intermediate round
4	Greece	3	0	0	3	80	93	−13	0	Elimination round

Source: EHF
Rules for classification: 1) points; 2) head-to-head points; 3) head-to-head goal difference; 4) head-to-head number of goals scored; 5) Goal difference.

7 August 2024; 12:00	Slovenia	33–31	Greece	Morača Sports Center, Podgorica; Referees: Peretz, Schwartz (ISR)
7 August 2024; 12:00	Anžič 8	(18–11)	Alexiou, Zismatos 5	Morača Sports Center, Podgorica; Referees: Peretz, Schwartz (ISR)
7 August 2024; 12:00	2× (suspension)	Report	1× (yellow card) 2× (suspension)	Morača Sports Center, Podgorica; Referees: Peretz, Schwartz (ISR)

7 August 2024; 14:30	Croatia	35–36	Serbia	Morača Sports Center, Podgorica; Referees: Aylagas, Zaragutea (ESP)
7 August 2024; 14:30	Vidović 8	(18–17)	Draško 14	Morača Sports Center, Podgorica; Referees: Aylagas, Zaragutea (ESP)
7 August 2024; 14:30	2× (suspension) 1× (red card)	Report	2× (suspension)	Morača Sports Center, Podgorica; Referees: Aylagas, Zaragutea (ESP)

8 August 2024; 12:00	Greece	18–28	Croatia	Morača Sports Center, Podgorica; Referees: Murariu, Paraschiv (ROM)
8 August 2024; 12:00	three players 3	(7–14)	Šprem 6	Morača Sports Center, Podgorica; Referees: Murariu, Paraschiv (ROM)
8 August 2024; 12:00	1× (yellow card) 2× (suspension)	Report	2× (yellow card) 6× (suspension)	Morača Sports Center, Podgorica; Referees: Murariu, Paraschiv (ROM)

8 August 2024; 14:30	Serbia	34–32	Slovenia	Morača Sports Center, Podgorica; Referees: R. Geraets, P. Geraets (NED)
8 August 2024; 14:30	Draško 12	(17–18)	Štaleker 7	Morača Sports Center, Podgorica; Referees: R. Geraets, P. Geraets (NED)
8 August 2024; 14:30	2× (suspension)	Report	1× (yellow card) 2× (suspension)	Morača Sports Center, Podgorica; Referees: R. Geraets, P. Geraets (NED)

10 August 2024; 17:00	Serbia	32–31	Greece	Morača Sports Center, Podgorica; Referees: Kaludjerovic, Vujacic (MNE)
10 August 2024; 17:00	Petković 7	(13–14)	Alexiou 9	Morača Sports Center, Podgorica; Referees: Kaludjerovic, Vujacic (MNE)
10 August 2024; 17:00	2× (suspension)	Report	2× (suspension)	Morača Sports Center, Podgorica; Referees: Kaludjerovic, Vujacic (MNE)

10 August 2024; 19:30	Croatia	33–29	Slovenia	Morača Sports Center, Podgorica; Referees: Doychinov, Goretsov (BUL)
10 August 2024; 19:30	Vidović 8	(14–12)	Štaleker 7	Morača Sports Center, Podgorica; Referees: Doychinov, Goretsov (BUL)
10 August 2024; 19:30	4× (suspension)	Report	5× (suspension)	Morača Sports Center, Podgorica; Referees: Doychinov, Goretsov (BUL)

=== Group B ===
Pos	Team	Pld	W	D	L	GF	GA	GD	Pts	Qualification
1	Germany	3	3	0	0	91	63	+28	6	Main round
2	France	3	2	0	1	88	76	+12	4	Intermediate round
3	Poland	3	1	0	2	72	101	−29	2	Elimination round
4	North Macedonia	3	0	0	3	73	84	−11	0	Elimination round

Source: EHF
Rules for classification: 1) points; 2) head-to-head points; 3) head-to-head goal difference; 4) head-to-head number of goals scored; 5) Goal difference.

7 August 2024; 12:00	France	29–28	North Macedonia	Bemax Arena, Podgorica; Referees: Murariu, Paraschiv (ROM)
7 August 2024; 12:00	Deloye 6	(14–14)	Mitev 9	Bemax Arena, Podgorica; Referees: Murariu, Paraschiv (ROM)
7 August 2024; 12:00	1× (yellow card) 2× (suspension) 1× (red card)	Report	2× (suspension) 1× (red card)	Bemax Arena, Podgorica; Referees: Murariu, Paraschiv (ROM)

7 August 2024; 14:30	Germany	39–21	Poland	Bemax Arena, Podgorica; Referees: Bosnjak, Maric (BIH)
7 August 2024; 14:30	Mudrow 6	(17–12)	Cebulski 5	Bemax Arena, Podgorica; Referees: Bosnjak, Maric (BIH)
7 August 2024; 14:30	1× (yellow card) 2× (suspension)	Report	1× (yellow card) 2× (suspension) 1× (red card)	Bemax Arena, Podgorica; Referees: Bosnjak, Maric (BIH)

8 August 2024; 12:00	North Macedonia	19–25	Germany	Bemax Arena, Podgorica; Referees: Peretz, Schwartz (ISR)
8 August 2024; 12:00	Ristevski 11	(9–10)	Mudrov 9	Bemax Arena, Podgorica; Referees: Peretz, Schwartz (ISR)
8 August 2024; 12:00	4× (suspension)	Report	1× (yellow card) 5× (suspension)	Bemax Arena, Podgorica; Referees: Peretz, Schwartz (ISR)

8 August 2024; 14:30	Poland	21–36	France	Bemax Arena, Podgorica; Referees: Kaludjerovic, Vujacic (MNE)
8 August 2024; 14:30	Chojnacki, Chrzastowski 4	(11–17)	Peyrabout 10	Bemax Arena, Podgorica; Referees: Kaludjerovic, Vujacic (MNE)
8 August 2024; 14:30	1× (yellow card) 2× (suspension)	Report	1× (yellow card) 5× (suspension)	Bemax Arena, Podgorica; Referees: Kaludjerovic, Vujacic (MNE)

10 August 2024; 14:30	Poland	30–26	North Macedonia	Bemax Arena, Podgorica; Referees: Aylagas, Zaragueta (ESP)
10 August 2024; 14:30	Chrzastowski 9	(14–11)	Mitev 12	Bemax Arena, Podgorica; Referees: Aylagas, Zaragueta (ESP)
10 August 2024; 14:30	2× (suspension)	Report	1× (yellow card)	Bemax Arena, Podgorica; Referees: Aylagas, Zaragueta (ESP)

10 August 2024; 19:30	Germany	27–23	France	Bemax Arena, Podgorica; Referees: Murariu, Paraschiv (ROM)
10 August 2024; 19:30	Murdow 7	(19–9)	Deloye 8	Bemax Arena, Podgorica; Referees: Murariu, Paraschiv (ROM)
10 August 2024; 19:30	1× (suspension)	Report	1× (yellow card) 5× (suspension)	Bemax Arena, Podgorica; Referees: Murariu, Paraschiv (ROM)

=== Group C ===
Pos	Team	Pld	W	D	L	GF	GA	GD	Pts	Qualification
1	Denmark	3	3	0	0	104	67	+37	6	Main round
2	Norway	3	2	0	1	100	82	+18	4	Main round
3	Czech Republic	3	1	0	2	81	91	−10	2	Intermediate round
4	Ukraine	3	0	0	3	60	105	−45	0	Elimination round

Source: EHF
Rules for classification: 1) points; 2) head-to-head points; 3) head-to-head goal difference; 4) head-to-head number of goals scored; 5) Goal difference.

7 August 2024; 12:00	Norway	41–23	Ukraine	Verde Complex, Podgorica; Referees: Rauchs, Linster (LUX)
7 August 2024; 12:00	Oma 9	(20–12)	Pavlovski 7	Verde Complex, Podgorica; Referees: Rauchs, Linster (LUX)
7 August 2024; 12:00	1× (yellow card) 2× (suspension)	Report	7× (suspension)	Verde Complex, Podgorica; Referees: Rauchs, Linster (LUX)

7 August 2024; 14:30	Denmark	38–24	Czech Republic	Verde Complex, Podgorica; Referees: Härgin, Makejev (EST)
7 August 2024; 14:30	Kjærgaard, Langmack 5	(16–11)	Vomácka 4	Verde Complex, Podgorica; Referees: Härgin, Makejev (EST)
7 August 2024; 14:30	2× (suspension)	Report	2× (suspension)	Verde Complex, Podgorica; Referees: Härgin, Makejev (EST)

8 August 2024; 12:00	Ukraine	17–36	Denmark	Verde Complex, Podgorica; Referees: Bosnjak, Maric (BIH)
8 August 2024; 12:00	Pavlovski 6	(11–15)	Jakobsen 10	Verde Complex, Podgorica; Referees: Bosnjak, Maric (BIH)
8 August 2024; 12:00	1× (yellow card) 2× (suspension)	Report	2× (suspension)	Verde Complex, Podgorica; Referees: Bosnjak, Maric (BIH)

8 August 2024; 14:30	Czech Republic	29–33	Norway	Verde Complex, Podgorica; Referees: Ayalgas, Zaragueta (ESP)
8 August 2024; 14:30	Vomácka 13	(13–17)	Oma, Søberg 7	Verde Complex, Podgorica; Referees: Ayalgas, Zaragueta (ESP)
8 August 2024; 14:30	1× (yellow card) 2× (suspension)	Report	2× (suspension) 1× (red card)	Verde Complex, Podgorica; Referees: Ayalgas, Zaragueta (ESP)

10 August 2024; 17:00	Czech Republic	28–20	Ukraine	Verde Complex, Podgorica; Referees: Peretz, Schwartz (ISR)
10 August 2024; 17:00	three players 5	(14–9)	Oskilko 8	Verde Complex, Podgorica; Referees: Peretz, Schwartz (ISR)
10 August 2024; 17:00	6× (suspension)	Report	1× (yellow card) 2× (suspension)	Verde Complex, Podgorica; Referees: Peretz, Schwartz (ISR)

10 August 2024; 19:30	Denmark	30–26	Norway	Verde Complex, Podgorica; Referees: Jakovljevic, Sando Kovacevic (SRB)
10 August 2024; 19:30	Jakobsen 7	(17–14)	Søberg 7	Verde Complex, Podgorica; Referees: Jakovljevic, Sando Kovacevic (SRB)
10 August 2024; 19:30	4× (suspension)	Report	1× (yellow card) 3× (suspension)	Verde Complex, Podgorica; Referees: Jakovljevic, Sando Kovacevic (SRB)

=== Group D ===
Pos	Team	Pld	W	D	L	GF	GA	GD	Pts	Qualification
1	Sweden	3	3	0	0	97	80	+17	6	Main round
2	Hungary	3	2	0	1	92	89	+3	4	Main round
3	Switzerland	3	1	0	2	83	89	−6	2	Intermediate round
4	Israel	3	0	0	3	84	98	−14	0	Elimination round

Source: EHF
Rules for classification: 1) points; 2) head-to-head points; 3) head-to-head goal difference; 4) head-to-head number of goals scored; 5) Goal difference.

7 August 2024; 17:00	Hungary	34–28	Israel	Verde Complex, Podgorica; Referees: Borge, Nygren (NOR)
7 August 2024; 17:00	Apró 9	(19–8)	Sharon 8	Verde Complex, Podgorica; Referees: Borge, Nygren (NOR)
7 August 2024; 17:00	3× (suspension)	Report	6× (suspension)	Verde Complex, Podgorica; Referees: Borge, Nygren (NOR)

7 August 2024; 19:30	Sweden	28–27	Switzerland	Verde Complex, Podgorica; Referees: Doychinov, Gorestov (BUL)
7 August 2024; 19:30	Hultberg 8	(12–10)	Cuencas, Mierzwa 5	Verde Complex, Podgorica; Referees: Doychinov, Gorestov (BUL)
7 August 2024; 19:30	1× (yellow card) 4× (suspension)	Report	2× (suspension)	Verde Complex, Podgorica; Referees: Doychinov, Gorestov (BUL)

8 August 2024; 17:00	Israel	27–34	Sweden	Verde Complex, Podgorica; Referees: Radcenko, Persis (LAT)
8 August 2024; 17:00	Sharon 10	(16–16)	Roganovic 6	Verde Complex, Podgorica; Referees: Radcenko, Persis (LAT)
8 August 2024; 17:00	2× (suspension) 1× (red card)	Report	5× (suspension)	Verde Complex, Podgorica; Referees: Radcenko, Persis (LAT)

8 August 2024; 19:30	Switzerland	26–32	Hungary	Verde Complex, Podgorica; Referees: Fotakidis, Kinatzidis (GRE)
8 August 2024; 19:30	Mierzwa 6	(17–16)	Eklemovic 8	Verde Complex, Podgorica; Referees: Fotakidis, Kinatzidis (GRE)
8 August 2024; 19:30	6× (suspension)	Report	2× (suspension)	Verde Complex, Podgorica; Referees: Fotakidis, Kinatzidis (GRE)

10 August 2024; 12:00	Switzerland	30–29	Israel	Verde Complex, Podgorica; Referees: Rauchs, Linster (LUX)
10 August 2024; 12:00	Mierzwa 6	(18–14)	Sharon 8	Verde Complex, Podgorica; Referees: Rauchs, Linster (LUX)
10 August 2024; 12:00	1× (yellow card) 2× (suspension)	Report	2× (suspension)	Verde Complex, Podgorica; Referees: Rauchs, Linster (LUX)

10 August 2024; 14:30	Sweden	35–26	Hungary	Verde Complex, Podgorica; Referees: R. Geraets, P. Gerates (NED)
10 August 2024; 14:30	Blomberg Romero, Roganovic 5	(19–13)	Eklemovic 5	Verde Complex, Podgorica; Referees: R. Geraets, P. Gerates (NED)
10 August 2024; 14:30	5× (suspension)	Report	3× (suspension)	Verde Complex, Podgorica; Referees: R. Geraets, P. Gerates (NED)

=== Group E ===
Pos	Team	Pld	W	D	L	GF	GA	GD	Pts	Qualification
1	Spain	3	3	0	0	112	82	+30	6	Main round
2	Portugal	3	2	0	1	91	95	−4	4	Intermediate round
3	Austria	3	1	0	2	89	92	−3	2	Intermediate round
4	Romania	3	0	0	3	81	104	−23	0	Elimination round

Source: EHF
Rules for classification: 1) points; 2) head-to-head points; 3) head-to-head goal difference; 4) head-to-head number of goals scored; 5) Goal difference.

7 August 2024; 17:00	Portugal	29–24	Romania	Morača Sports Center, Podgorica; Referees: R. Geraets, P. Gerates (NED)
7 August 2024; 17:00	Sousa 6	(10–7)	Ilucă 5	Morača Sports Center, Podgorica; Referees: R. Geraets, P. Gerates (NED)
7 August 2024; 17:00	1× (yellow card) 2× (suspension)	Report	2× (suspension)	Morača Sports Center, Podgorica; Referees: R. Geraets, P. Gerates (NED)

7 August 2024; 19:30	Spain	30–25	Austria	Morača Sports Center, Podgorica; Referees: M. Ilievski, M. Ilievski (MKD)
7 August 2024; 19:30	Fis 7	(13–13)	Fristch 10	Morača Sports Center, Podgorica; Referees: M. Ilievski, M. Ilievski (MKD)
7 August 2024; 19:30	7× (suspension)	Report	2× (suspension)	Morača Sports Center, Podgorica; Referees: M. Ilievski, M. Ilievski (MKD)

8 August 2024; 17:00	Romania	31–43	Spain	Morača Sports Center, Podgorica; Referees: Jakovljevic, Sando Kovacevic (SRB)
8 August 2024; 17:00	four players 5	(16–20)	Vila 7	Morača Sports Center, Podgorica; Referees: Jakovljevic, Sando Kovacevic (SRB)
8 August 2024; 17:00	2× (suspension)	Report	1× (yellow card) 7× (suspension)	Morača Sports Center, Podgorica; Referees: Jakovljevic, Sando Kovacevic (SRB)

8 August 2024; 19:30	Austria	32–36	Portugal	Morača Sports Center, Podgorica; Referees: Doychinov, Goretsov (BUL)
8 August 2024; 19:30	Fritsch 7	(13–19)	Rodrigues Magalhães 7	Morača Sports Center, Podgorica; Referees: Doychinov, Goretsov (BUL)
8 August 2024; 19:30		Report	1× (yellow card) 7× (suspension)	Morača Sports Center, Podgorica; Referees: Doychinov, Goretsov (BUL)

10 August 2024; 12:00	Austria	32–26	Romania	Morača Sports Center, Podgorica; Referees: Radcenko, Persis (LAT)
10 August 2024; 12:00	Gaydusek, Fritsch 5	(18–14)	Dascălu 9	Morača Sports Center, Podgorica; Referees: Radcenko, Persis (LAT)
10 August 2024; 12:00	1× (yellow card) 2× (suspension)	Report	2× (suspension)	Morača Sports Center, Podgorica; Referees: Radcenko, Persis (LAT)

10 August 2024; 14:30	Spain	39–26	Portugal	Morača Sports Center, Podgorica; Referees: Borge, Nygren (NOR)
10 August 2024; 14:30	Vila 6	(22–13)	Bandeira Lourenço 6	Morača Sports Center, Podgorica; Referees: Borge, Nygren (NOR)
10 August 2024; 14:30	5× (suspension)	Report	1× (yellow card) 2× (suspension)	Morača Sports Center, Podgorica; Referees: Borge, Nygren (NOR)

=== Group F ===
Pos	Team	Pld	W	D	L	GF	GA	GD	Pts	Qualification
1	Iceland	3	3	0	0	88	69	+19	6	Main round
2	Faroe Islands	3	1	1	1	77	78	−1	3	Intermediate round
3	Italy	3	1	0	2	82	95	−13	2	Elimination round
4	Montenegro (H)	3	0	1	2	72	77	−5	1	Elimination round

Source: EHF
Rules for classification: 1) points; 2) head-to-head points; 3) head-to-head goal difference; 4) head-to-head number of goals scored; 5) Goal difference.
(H) Hosts

7 August 2024; 17:00	Montenegro	30–32	Italy	Bemax Arena, Podgorica; Referees: Fotakidis, Kinatzidis (GRE)
7 August 2024; 17:00	Radoičić 8	(15–16)	Somma 7	Bemax Arena, Podgorica; Referees: Fotakidis, Kinatzidis (GRE)
7 August 2024; 17:00	7× (suspension)	Report	4× (suspension)	Bemax Arena, Podgorica; Referees: Fotakidis, Kinatzidis (GRE)

7 August 2024; 19:30	Iceland	32–23	Faroe Islands	Bemax Arena, Podgorica; Referees: Radcenko, Persis (LAT)
7 August 2024; 19:30	Heimmison 13	(15–9)	Hammer 7	Bemax Arena, Podgorica; Referees: Radcenko, Persis (LAT)
7 August 2024; 19:30	5× (suspension)	Report	5× (suspension)	Bemax Arena, Podgorica; Referees: Radcenko, Persis (LAT)

8 August 2024; 17:00	Faroe Islands	20–20	Montenegro	Bemax Arena, Podgorica; Referees: Härgin, Makejev (EST)
8 August 2024; 17:00	Egholm, Árason 6	(8–8)	Lalošević, Radoičić 4	Bemax Arena, Podgorica; Referees: Härgin, Makejev (EST)
8 August 2024; 17:00		Report	1× (yellow card) 3× (suspension)	Bemax Arena, Podgorica; Referees: Härgin, Makejev (EST)

8 August 2024; 19:30	Italy	24–31	Iceland	Bemax Arena, Podgorica; Referees: M. Ilievski, M. Ilievski (MKD)
8 August 2024; 19:30	Conte 5	(9–15)	Heimisson 9	Bemax Arena, Podgorica; Referees: M. Ilievski, M. Ilievski (MKD)
8 August 2024; 19:30	1× (suspension)	Report	6× (suspension)	Bemax Arena, Podgorica; Referees: M. Ilievski, M. Ilievski (MKD)

10 August 2024; 12:00	Faroe Islands	34–26	Italy	Bemax Arena, Podgorica; Referees: Bosnjak, Maric (BIH)
10 August 2024; 12:00	Rasmussen 10	(16–10)	Squarzon Imhenrion 7	Bemax Arena, Podgorica; Referees: Bosnjak, Maric (BIH)
10 August 2024; 12:00	5× (suspension)	Report	4× (suspension)	Bemax Arena, Podgorica; Referees: Bosnjak, Maric (BIH)

10 August 2024; 17:00	Iceland	25–22	Montenegro	Bemax Arena, Podgorica; Referees: Fotakidis, Kintazidis (GRE)
10 August 2024; 17:00	Guðmundsson 7	(13–11)	Peruničić, Radoičić 6	Bemax Arena, Podgorica; Referees: Fotakidis, Kintazidis (GRE)
10 August 2024; 17:00	4× (suspension)	Report	4× (suspension) 1× (red card)	Bemax Arena, Podgorica; Referees: Fotakidis, Kintazidis (GRE)

=== Ranking of second-placed teams ===
Groups A, B and C

Pos	Grp	Team	Pld	W	D	L	GF	GA	GD	Pts	Qualification
1	C	Norway	3	2	0	1	100	82	+18	4	Main round
2	A	Croatia	3	2	0	1	96	83	+13	4	Intermediate round
3	B	France	3	2	0	1	88	76	+12	4	Intermediate round

Source: EHF
Rules for classification: 1) points; 2) head-to-head points; 3) head-to-head goal difference; 4) head-to-head number of goals scored; 5) goal difference.

Groups D, E and F

Pos	Grp	Team	Pld	W	D	L	GF	GA	GD	Pts	Qualification
1	D	Hungary	3	2	0	1	92	89	+3	4	Main round
2	E	Portugal	3	2	0	1	91	95	−4	4	Intermediate round
3	F	Faroe Islands	3	1	1	1	77	78	−1	3	Intermediate round

Source: EHF
Rules for classification: 1) points; 2) head-to-head points; 3) head-to-head goal difference; 4) head-to-head number of goals scored; 5) goal difference.

=== Ranking of third-placed teams ===
Groups A, B and C

Pos	Grp	Team	Pld	W	D	L	GF	GA	GD	Pts	Qualification
1	A	Slovenia	3	1	0	2	94	98	−4	2	Intermediate round
2	C	Czech Republic	3	1	0	2	81	91	−10	2	Intermediate round
3	B	Poland	3	1	0	2	72	101	−29	2	Elimination round

Updated to match(es) played on unknown. Source: EHF
Rules for classification: 1) points; 2) goal difference; 3) number of goals scored.

Groups D, E and F

Pos	Grp	Team	Pld	W	D	L	GF	GA	GD	Pts	Qualification
1	E	Austria	3	1	0	2	89	92	−3	2	Intermediate round
2	D	Switzerland	3	1	0	2	83	89	−6	2	Intermediate round
3	F	Italy	3	1	0	2	82	95	−13	2	Elimination round

Source: EHF
Rules for classification: 1) points; 2) goal difference; 3) number of goals scored.

== Elimination round ==
=== Group E1 ===
Pos	Team	Pld	W	D	L	GF	GA	GD	Pts	Qualification
1	Poland	3	2	0	1	90	82	+8	4	17–20th place semifinals
2	Israel	3	2	0	1	104	98	+6	4	17–20th place semifinals
3	Romania	3	1	1	1	75	77	−2	3	21–24th place semifinals
4	Montenegro (H)	3	0	1	2	72	84	−12	1	21–24th place semifinals

Source: EHF
Rules for classification: 1) points; 2) head-to-head points; 3) head-to-head goal difference; 4) head-to-head number of goals scored; 5) Goal difference.
(H) Hosts

12 August 2024; 17:00	Poland	38–37	Israel	Verde Complex, Podgorica; Referees: Bosnjak, Maric (BIH)
12 August 2024; 17:00	Lewczyk 6	(21–20)	Sharon 15	Verde Complex, Podgorica; Referees: Bosnjak, Maric (BIH)
12 August 2024; 17:00	4× (suspension)	Report	1× (yellow card) 5× (suspension)	Verde Complex, Podgorica; Referees: Bosnjak, Maric (BIH)

12 August 2024; 19:30	Montenegro	21–21	Romania	Verde Complex, Podgorica; Referees: Doychinov, Goretsov (BUL)
12 August 2024; 19:30	Lalošević, Radoičić 4	(12–9)	three players 3	Verde Complex, Podgorica; Referees: Doychinov, Goretsov (BUL)
12 August 2024; 19:30	2× (yellow card) 4× (suspension)	Report	3× (suspension)	Verde Complex, Podgorica; Referees: Doychinov, Goretsov (BUL)

13 August 2024; 17:00	Israel	33–29	Montenegro	Verde Complex, Podgorica; Referees: R. Gerates, P. Geraets (NED)
13 August 2024; 17:00	Sharon 11	(21–14)	Peruničić 9	Verde Complex, Podgorica; Referees: R. Gerates, P. Geraets (NED)
13 August 2024; 17:00	5× (suspension)	Report	1× (yellow card) 6× (suspension)	Verde Complex, Podgorica; Referees: R. Gerates, P. Geraets (NED)

13 August 2024; 19:30	Romania	23–22	Poland	Verde Complex, Podgorica; Referees: M. Ilievski, M. Ilievski (MKD)
13 August 2024; 19:30	Dascălu 6	(9–13)	Lewczyk 6	Verde Complex, Podgorica; Referees: M. Ilievski, M. Ilievski (MKD)
13 August 2024; 19:30	1× (yellow card) 1× (suspension)	Report	5× (suspension)	Verde Complex, Podgorica; Referees: M. Ilievski, M. Ilievski (MKD)

15 August 2024; 17:00	Poland	30–22	Montenegro	Morača Sports Center, Podgorica; Referees: Borge, Nygren (NOR)
15 August 2024; 17:00	Florkiewicz 6	(16–13)	Božović 5	Morača Sports Center, Podgorica; Referees: Borge, Nygren (NOR)
15 August 2024; 17:00	5× (suspension) 1× (red card)	Report	4× (suspension)	Morača Sports Center, Podgorica; Referees: Borge, Nygren (NOR)

15 August 2024; 19:30	Israel	34–31	Romania	Morača Sports Center, Podgorica; Referees: Aylagas, Zaragueta (ESP)
15 August 2024; 19:30	Sharon 11	(19–16)	Dascălu 10	Morača Sports Center, Podgorica; Referees: Aylagas, Zaragueta (ESP)
15 August 2024; 19:30	2× (suspension)	Report	1× (yellow card) 5× (suspension)	Morača Sports Center, Podgorica; Referees: Aylagas, Zaragueta (ESP)

=== Group E2 ===
Pos	Team	Pld	W	D	L	GF	GA	GD	Pts	Qualification
1	North Macedonia	3	2	0	1	74	66	+8	4	17–20th place semifinals
2	Greece	3	2	0	1	84	80	+4	4	17–20th place semifinals
3	Italy	3	2	0	1	82	83	−1	4	21–24th place semifinals
4	Ukraine	3	0	0	3	75	86	−11	0	21–24th place semifinals

Source: EHF
Rules for classification: 1) points; 2) head-to-head points; 3) head-to-head goal difference; 4) head-to-head number of goals scored; 5) Goal difference.

12 August 2024; 12:00	Italy	31–30	Greece	Verde Complex, Podgorica; Referees: Borge, Nygren (NOR)
12 August 2024; 12:00	Khouaja 8	(15–14)	Tsioumas 9	Verde Complex, Podgorica; Referees: Borge, Nygren (NOR)
12 August 2024; 12:00	1× (yellow card) 3× (suspension)	Report	6× (suspension)	Verde Complex, Podgorica; Referees: Borge, Nygren (NOR)

12 August 2024; 14:30	North Macedonia	26–21	Ukraine	Verde Complex, Podgorica; Referees: Härgin, Makejev (EST)
12 August 2024; 14:30	Ristevski 8	(10–10)	Pavlovskyi, Oskilko 6	Verde Complex, Podgorica; Referees: Härgin, Makejev (EST)
12 August 2024; 14:30	2× (suspension)	Report	1× (suspension)	Verde Complex, Podgorica; Referees: Härgin, Makejev (EST)

13 August 2024; 12:00	Ukraine	30–32	Italy	Verde Complex, Podgorica; Referees: Radcenko, Persis (LAT)
13 August 2024; 12:00	Pavlovskyi, Kurmaz 7	(20–15)	Khouaja 6	Verde Complex, Podgorica; Referees: Radcenko, Persis (LAT)
13 August 2024; 12:00	1× (suspension)	Report	3× (suspension)	Verde Complex, Podgorica; Referees: Radcenko, Persis (LAT)

13 August 2024; 14:30	Greece	26–25	North Macedonia	Verde Complex, Podgorica; Referees: Rauchs, Linster (LUX)
13 August 2024; 14:30	Tsioumas 10	(9–11)	Mitev 7	Verde Complex, Podgorica; Referees: Rauchs, Linster (LUX)
13 August 2024; 14:30	1× (yellow card) 3× (suspension)	Report	2× (suspension)	Verde Complex, Podgorica; Referees: Rauchs, Linster (LUX)

15 August 2024; 12:00	Italy	19–23	North Macedonia	Morača Sports Center, Podgorica; Referees: Härgin, Makejev (EST)
15 August 2024; 12:00	Khouaja 4	(11–11)	Mitev 6	Morača Sports Center, Podgorica; Referees: Härgin, Makejev (EST)
15 August 2024; 12:00	2× (suspension)	Report	1× (yellow card) 2× (suspension)	Morača Sports Center, Podgorica; Referees: Härgin, Makejev (EST)

15 August 2024; 14:30	Greece	28–24	Ukraine	Morača Sports Center, Podgorica; Referees: Jakovljevic, Sando Kovacevic (SRB)
15 August 2024; 14:30	Tzeli, Rarakos 5	(13–15)	Pavlovskyi 9	Morača Sports Center, Podgorica; Referees: Jakovljevic, Sando Kovacevic (SRB)
15 August 2024; 14:30	1× (yellow card) 6× (suspension)	Report	3× (suspension)	Morača Sports Center, Podgorica; Referees: Jakovljevic, Sando Kovacevic (SRB)

== Intermediate round ==
=== Group I1 ===
Pos	Team	Pld	W	D	L	GF	GA	GD	Pts	Qualification
1	France	3	2	1	0	101	93	+8	5	9–12th place semifinals
2	Switzerland	3	2	0	1	94	94	0	4	9–12th place semifinals
3	Croatia	3	1	1	1	89	85	+4	3	13–16th place semifinals
4	Austria	3	0	0	3	79	91	−12	0	13–16th place semifinals

Source: EHF
Rules for classification: 1) points; 2) head-to-head points; 3) head-to-head goal difference; 4) head-to-head number of goals scored; 5) Goal difference.

12 August 2024; 17:00	Croatia	30–22	Austria	Morača Sports Center, Podgorica; Referees: R. Gerates, P. Geraets (NED)
12 August 2024; 17:00	Šprem 6	(16–11)	Tikvic 6	Morača Sports Center, Podgorica; Referees: R. Gerates, P. Geraets (NED)
12 August 2024; 17:00	3× (suspension)	Report	1× (suspension)	Morača Sports Center, Podgorica; Referees: R. Gerates, P. Geraets (NED)

12 August 2024; 19:30	France	38–33	Switzerland	Morača Sports Center, Podgorica; Referees: Jakovljevic, Sando Kovacevic (SRB)
12 August 2024; 19:30	Gourguechon 10	(18–18)	Mierzwa 9	Morača Sports Center, Podgorica; Referees: Jakovljevic, Sando Kovacevic (SRB)
12 August 2024; 19:30	1× (yellow card) 2× (suspension)	Report	1× (yellow card) 4× (suspension)	Morača Sports Center, Podgorica; Referees: Jakovljevic, Sando Kovacevic (SRB)

13 August 2024; 17:00	Switzerland	33–29	Croatia	Morača Sports Center, Podgorica; Referees: Kaludjerovic, Vujacic (MNE)
13 August 2024; 17:00	Mierzwa, Ugiagbe 6	(13–12)	Tomić 10	Morača Sports Center, Podgorica; Referees: Kaludjerovic, Vujacic (MNE)
13 August 2024; 17:00	1× (yellow card) 6× (suspension) 1× (red card)	Report	2× (suspension)	Morača Sports Center, Podgorica; Referees: Kaludjerovic, Vujacic (MNE)

13 August 2024; 19:30	Austria	30–33	France	Morača Sports Center, Podgorica; Referees: Härgin, Makejev (EST)
13 August 2024; 19:30	Danhel, Fritsch 6	(13–18)	Peyrabout 15	Morača Sports Center, Podgorica; Referees: Härgin, Makejev (EST)
13 August 2024; 19:30	1× (yellow card) 3× (suspension)	Report	3× (suspension)	Morača Sports Center, Podgorica; Referees: Härgin, Makejev (EST)

15 August 2024; 17:00	Croatia	30–30	France	Verde Complex, Podgorica; Referees: Peretz, Schwartz (ISR)
15 August 2024; 17:00	Grubišić 7	(9–15)	Gourguechon 9	Verde Complex, Podgorica; Referees: Peretz, Schwartz (ISR)
15 August 2024; 17:00	1× (yellow card) 3× (suspension)	Report	1× (yellow card) 5× (suspension) 1× (red card)	Verde Complex, Podgorica; Referees: Peretz, Schwartz (ISR)

15 August 2024; 19:30	Austria	27–28	Switzerland	Verde Complex, Podgorica; Referees: Rauchs, Linster (LUX)
15 August 2024; 19:30	Fritsch 6	(12–16)	Mierzwa 8	Verde Complex, Podgorica; Referees: Rauchs, Linster (LUX)
15 August 2024; 19:30	2× (yellow card) 5× (suspension)	Report	2× (suspension)	Verde Complex, Podgorica; Referees: Rauchs, Linster (LUX)

=== Group I2 ===
Pos	Team	Pld	W	D	L	GF	GA	GD	Pts	Qualification
1	Slovenia	3	3	0	0	101	74	+27	6	9–12th place semifinals
2	Portugal	3	2	0	1	102	84	+18	4	9–12th place semifinals
3	Czech Republic	3	1	0	2	76	101	−25	2	13–16th place semifinals
4	Faroe Islands	3	0	0	3	80	100	−20	0	13–16th place semifinals

Source: EHF
Rules for classification: 1) points; 2) head-to-head points; 3) head-to-head goal difference; 4) head-to-head number of goals scored; 5) Goal difference.

12 August 2024; 12:00	Portugal	28–31	Slovenia	Morača Sports Center, Podgorica; Referees: Murariu, Paraschiv (ROM)
12 August 2024; 12:00	Sousa, Vasconcelos 9	(11–15)	Šcuka 5	Morača Sports Center, Podgorica; Referees: Murariu, Paraschiv (ROM)
12 August 2024; 12:00	4× (suspension)	Report	1× (yellow card) 4× (suspension)	Morača Sports Center, Podgorica; Referees: Murariu, Paraschiv (ROM)

12 August 2024; 14:30	Faroe Islands	28–29	Czech Republic	Morača Sports Center, Podgorica; Referees: Kaludjerovic, Vujacic (MNE)
12 August 2024; 14:30	Hammer 7	(13–18)	Skopar 7	Morača Sports Center, Podgorica; Referees: Kaludjerovic, Vujacic (MNE)
12 August 2024; 14:30	1× (yellow card) 5× (suspension)	Report	1× (yellow card) 3× (suspension)	Morača Sports Center, Podgorica; Referees: Kaludjerovic, Vujacic (MNE)

13 August 2024; 12:00	Slovenia	35–25	Faroe Islands	Morača Sports Center, Podgorica; Referees: Jakovljevic, Sando Kovacevic (SRB)
13 August 2024; 12:00	Anžič 12	(17–13)	Egholm 9	Morača Sports Center, Podgorica; Referees: Jakovljevic, Sando Kovacevic (SRB)
13 August 2024; 12:00	1× (suspension)	Report	1× (yellow card) 5× (suspension)	Morača Sports Center, Podgorica; Referees: Jakovljevic, Sando Kovacevic (SRB)

13 August 2024; 14:30	Czech Republic	26–38	Portugal	Morača Sports Center, Podgorica; Referees: Bosnjak, Maric (BIH)
13 August 2024; 14:30	Skopar 6	(12–21)	Nunes 10	Morača Sports Center, Podgorica; Referees: Bosnjak, Maric (BIH)
13 August 2024; 14:30	3× (suspension)	Report	1× (yellow card) 2× (suspension)	Morača Sports Center, Podgorica; Referees: Bosnjak, Maric (BIH)

15 August 2024; 12:00	Portugal	36–27	Faroe Islands	Verde Complex, Podgorica; Referees: Radcenko, Persis (LAT)
15 August 2024; 12:00	Mendes 11	(22–13)	Í Innistovu 7	Verde Complex, Podgorica; Referees: Radcenko, Persis (LAT)
15 August 2024; 12:00	4× (suspension)	Report	1× (suspension)	Verde Complex, Podgorica; Referees: Radcenko, Persis (LAT)

15 August 2024; 14:30	Slovenia	35–21	Czech Republic	Verde Complex, Podgorica; Referees: Bosnjak, Maric (BIH)
15 August 2024; 14:30	Štaleker, Anžič 5	(16–10)	Vomácka 6	Verde Complex, Podgorica; Referees: Bosnjak, Maric (BIH)
15 August 2024; 14:30	2× (suspension)	Report	2× (suspension)	Verde Complex, Podgorica; Referees: Bosnjak, Maric (BIH)

== Main round ==
Points and goals gained in the preliminary group against teams that advanced was transferred to the main round.

=== Group M1 ===
Pos	Team	Pld	W	D	L	GF	GA	GD	Pts	Qualification
1	Denmark	3	2	1	0	81	76	+5	5	Semifinals
2	Hungary	3	2	0	1	84	79	+5	4	Semifinals
3	Germany	3	1	0	2	79	82	−3	2	5–8th place semifinals
4	Serbia	3	0	1	2	93	100	−7	1	5–8th place semifinals

Source: EHF
Rules for classification: 1) points; 2) head-to-head points; 3) head-to-head goal difference; 4) head-to-head number of goals scored; 5) Goal difference.

12 August 2024; 17:00	Serbia	29–29	Denmark	Bemax Arena, Podgorica; Referees: Rauchs, Linster (LUX)
12 August 2024; 17:00	Cenić 8	(14–14)	three players 5	Bemax Arena, Podgorica; Referees: Rauchs, Linster (LUX)
12 August 2024; 17:00	1× (yellow card) 6× (suspension)	Report	2× (suspension)	Bemax Arena, Podgorica; Referees: Rauchs, Linster (LUX)

12 August 2024; 19:30	Germany	20–25	Hungary	Bemax Arena, Podgorica; Referees: M. Ilievski, M. Ilievski (MKD)
12 August 2024; 19:30	Zink 4	(10–11)	Mészáros 6	Bemax Arena, Podgorica; Referees: M. Ilievski, M. Ilievski (MKD)
12 August 2024; 19:30	1× (yellow card) 1× (suspension)	Report	2× (yellow card) 2× (suspension)	Bemax Arena, Podgorica; Referees: M. Ilievski, M. Ilievski (MKD)

13 August 2024; 17:00	Denmark	26–24	Germany	Bemax Arena, Podgorica; Referees: Borge, Nygren (NOR)
13 August 2024; 17:00	Jensen 6	(14–12)	Sprößig 6	Bemax Arena, Podgorica; Referees: Borge, Nygren (NOR)
13 August 2024; 17:00	1× (yellow card) 1× (suspension)	Report	3× (suspension)	Bemax Arena, Podgorica; Referees: Borge, Nygren (NOR)

13 August 2024; 19:30	Hungary	36–33	Serbia	Bemax Arena, Podgorica; Referees: Aylagas, Zaragueta (ESP)
13 August 2024; 19:30	Fazekas 7	(16–18)	Draško 17	Bemax Arena, Podgorica; Referees: Aylagas, Zaragueta (ESP)
13 August 2024; 19:30	4× (suspension) 1× (red card)	Report	7× (suspension)	Bemax Arena, Podgorica; Referees: Aylagas, Zaragueta (ESP)

15 August 2024; 17:00	Serbia	31–35	Germany	Bemax Arena, Podgorica; Referees: R. Geraets, P. Geraets (NED)
15 August 2024; 17:00	Stanković, Cenić 8	(16–18)	Mudrow, Schröder 8	Bemax Arena, Podgorica; Referees: R. Geraets, P. Geraets (NED)
15 August 2024; 17:00	4× (suspension)	Report	2× (suspension)	Bemax Arena, Podgorica; Referees: R. Geraets, P. Geraets (NED)

15 August 2024; 19:30	Denmark	26–23	Hungary	Bemax Arena, Podgorica; Referees: Murariu, Paraschiv (ROM)
15 August 2024; 19:30	Sørensen 7	(10–13)	Sikler 8	Bemax Arena, Podgorica; Referees: Murariu, Paraschiv (ROM)
15 August 2024; 19:30	1× (yellow card) 4× (suspension)	Report	1× (yellow card) 4× (suspension) 1× (red card)	Bemax Arena, Podgorica; Referees: Murariu, Paraschiv (ROM)

=== Group M2 ===
Pos	Team	Pld	W	D	L	GF	GA	GD	Pts	Qualification
1	Sweden	3	2	0	1	98	87	+11	4	Semifinals
2	Iceland	3	2	0	1	92	86	+6	4	Semifinals
3	Spain	3	2	0	1	98	92	+6	4	5–8th place semifinals
4	Norway	3	0	0	3	83	106	−23	0	5–8th place semifinals

Source: EHF
Rules for classification: 1) points; 2) head-to-head points; 3) head-to-head goal difference; 4) head-to-head number of goals scored; 5) Goal difference.

12 August 2024; 12:00	Sweden	29–34	Iceland	Bemax Arena, Podgorica; Referees: Peretz, Schwartz (ISR)
12 August 2024; 12:00	Roganovic 6	(16–19)	Guðmundsson 12	Bemax Arena, Podgorica; Referees: Peretz, Schwartz (ISR)
12 August 2024; 12:00	1× (suspension)	Report	1× (yellow card) 5× (suspension)	Bemax Arena, Podgorica; Referees: Peretz, Schwartz (ISR)

12 August 2024; 14:30	Spain	39–32	Norway	Bemax Arena, Podgorica; Referees: Fotakidis, Kinatzidis (GRE)
12 August 2024; 14:30	Fis, Vila 7	(18–21)	Løke Gautestad, Tønnesen 6	Bemax Arena, Podgorica; Referees: Fotakidis, Kinatzidis (GRE)
12 August 2024; 14:30	5× (suspension)	Report	3× (suspension)	Bemax Arena, Podgorica; Referees: Fotakidis, Kinatzidis (GRE)

13 August 2024; 12:00	Norway	26–36	Sweden	Bemax Arena, Podgorica; Referees: Murariu, Paraschiv (ROM)
13 August 2024; 12:00	Ask 7	(10–19)	Roganovic 8	Bemax Arena, Podgorica; Referees: Murariu, Paraschiv (ROM)
13 August 2024; 12:00	1× (yellow card) 2× (suspension)	Report	1× (yellow card) 4× (suspension)	Bemax Arena, Podgorica; Referees: Murariu, Paraschiv (ROM)

13 August 2024; 14:30	Iceland	27–32	Spain	Bemax Arena, Podgorica; Referees: Doychinov, Gorestov (BUL)
13 August 2024; 14:30	Guðmundsson 9	(13–11)	Rocas, Fis 9	Bemax Arena, Podgorica; Referees: Doychinov, Gorestov (BUL)
13 August 2024; 14:30	1× (yellow card) 4× (suspension)	Report	1× (yellow card) 4× (suspension)	Bemax Arena, Podgorica; Referees: Doychinov, Gorestov (BUL)

15 August 2024; 12:00	Sweden	33–27	Spain	Bemax Arena, Podgorica; Referees: M. Ilievski, M. Ilievski (MKD)
15 August 2024; 12:00	Roganovic 8	(13–14)	Fis 8	Bemax Arena, Podgorica; Referees: M. Ilievski, M. Ilievski (MKD)
15 August 2024; 12:00	2× (suspension)	Report	5× (suspension) 1× (red card)	Bemax Arena, Podgorica; Referees: M. Ilievski, M. Ilievski (MKD)

15 August 2024; 14:30	Iceland	31–25	Norway	Bemax Arena, Podgorica; Referees: Kaludjerovic, Vujacic (MNE)
15 August 2024; 14:30	Guðmundsson 6	(17–9)	Søberg, Tønnesen 6	Bemax Arena, Podgorica; Referees: Kaludjerovic, Vujacic (MNE)
15 August 2024; 14:30	3× (suspension)	Report	2× (suspension)	Bemax Arena, Podgorica; Referees: Kaludjerovic, Vujacic (MNE)

== Placement round ==
=== Bracket ===
21st place bracket

21–24th place semifinals
16 August
Romania	35
Ukraine	29
16 August
Italy	28
Montenegro	26

21st place
17 August
Romania	33
Italy	35
23rd place
17 August
Ukraine	23
Montenegro	29

=== 21–24th place semifinals ===
16 August 2024; 12:00	Romania	35–29	Ukraine	Morača Sports Center, Podgorica; Referees: Rauchs, Linster (LUX)
16 August 2024; 12:00	Ancuța 7	(17–16)	Oskilko 8	Morača Sports Center, Podgorica; Referees: Rauchs, Linster (LUX)
16 August 2024; 12:00	4× (suspension) 1× (red card)	Report	7× (suspension) 1× (red card)	Morača Sports Center, Podgorica; Referees: Rauchs, Linster (LUX)

16 August 2024; 14:30	Italy	28–26	Montenegro	Morača Sports Center, Podgorica; Referees: Peretz, Schwartz (ISR)
16 August 2024; 14:30	Carrara 7	(10–13)	Maljevic 6	Morača Sports Center, Podgorica; Referees: Peretz, Schwartz (ISR)
16 August 2024; 14:30	1× (yellow card) 1× (suspension)	Report	1× (yellow card) 3× (suspension)	Morača Sports Center, Podgorica; Referees: Peretz, Schwartz (ISR)

=== 23rd place game ===
17 August 2024; 12:00	Ukraine	23–29	Montenegro	Verde Complex, Podgorica; Referees: Fotakidis, Kintazidis (GRE)
17 August 2024; 12:00	Oskilko 6	(10–14)	Gutic 10	Verde Complex, Podgorica; Referees: Fotakidis, Kintazidis (GRE)
17 August 2024; 12:00	1× (suspension)	Report	4× (suspension)	Verde Complex, Podgorica; Referees: Fotakidis, Kintazidis (GRE)

=== 21st place game ===
17 August 2024; 14:30	Romania	33–35	Italy	Verde Complex, Podgorica; Referees: Jakovljevic, Sando Kovacevic (SRB)
17 August 2024; 14:30	Negrilă 9	(17–18)	Yatawarage 7	Verde Complex, Podgorica; Referees: Jakovljevic, Sando Kovacevic (SRB)
17 August 2024; 14:30	1× (yellow card) 2× (suspension)	Report	1× (suspension)	Verde Complex, Podgorica; Referees: Jakovljevic, Sando Kovacevic (SRB)

17st place bracket

17–20th place semifinals
16 August
Poland	31
Greece	25
16 August
North Macedonia	25
Israel	32

17th place
17 August
Poland	27
Israel	32
19td place
17 August
Greece	24
North Macedonia	26

=== 17–20th place semifinals ===
16 August 2024; 17:00	Poland	31–25	Greece	Morača Sports Center, Podgorica; Referees: Bosnjak, Maric (BIH)
16 August 2024; 17:00	Chrzastowski 9	(17–12)	Kerlidis 5	Morača Sports Center, Podgorica; Referees: Bosnjak, Maric (BIH)
16 August 2024; 17:00	5× (suspension)	Report	3× (suspension)	Morača Sports Center, Podgorica; Referees: Bosnjak, Maric (BIH)

16 August 2024; 19:30	North Macedonia	25–32	Israel	Morača Sports Center, Podgorica; Referees: Borge, Nygren (NOR)
16 August 2024; 19:30	Krstevski 6	(12–13)	Sharon 8	Morača Sports Center, Podgorica; Referees: Borge, Nygren (NOR)
16 August 2024; 19:30	1× (yellow card) 2× (suspension)	Report	5× (suspension)	Morača Sports Center, Podgorica; Referees: Borge, Nygren (NOR)

=== 19th place game ===
17 August 2024; 17:00	Greece	24–26	North Macedonia	Verde Complex, Podgorica; Referees: Rauchs, Linster (LUX)
17 August 2024; 17:00	Tsioumas 5	(9–12)	Dimovski 11	Verde Complex, Podgorica; Referees: Rauchs, Linster (LUX)
17 August 2024; 17:00	5× (suspension)	Report	4× (suspension)	Verde Complex, Podgorica; Referees: Rauchs, Linster (LUX)

=== 17th place game ===
17 August 2024; 19:30	Poland	27–32	Israel	Verde Complex, Podgorica; Referees: Härgin, Makejev (EST)
17 August 2024; 19:30	Stawicki 7	(7–13)	Sharon 8	Verde Complex, Podgorica; Referees: Härgin, Makejev (EST)
17 August 2024; 19:30	1× (yellow card) 5× (suspension)	Report	1× (yellow card) 3× (suspension)	Verde Complex, Podgorica; Referees: Härgin, Makejev (EST)

13th place bracket

13–16th place semifinals
16 August
Croatia	28
Faroe Islands	27
16 August
Czech Republic	29
Austria	28

13th place
18 August
Croatia	30
Czech Republic	29
15th place
18 August
Faroe Islands	26
Austria	24

=== 13–16th place semifinals ===
16 August 2024; 12:00	Croatia	28–27	Faroe Islands	Verde Complex, Podgorica; Referees: R. Geraets, P. Geraets (NED)
16 August 2024; 12:00	Moslavac 8	(14–15)	Hammer 12	Verde Complex, Podgorica; Referees: R. Geraets, P. Geraets (NED)
16 August 2024; 12:00	3× (suspension)	Report	1× (yellow card) 3× (suspension)	Verde Complex, Podgorica; Referees: R. Geraets, P. Geraets (NED)

16 August 2024; 14:30	Czech Republic	29–28	Austria	Verde Complex, Podgorica; Referees: M. Ilievski, M. Ilievski (MKD)
16 August 2024; 14:30	three players 5	(17–15)	three players 5	Verde Complex, Podgorica; Referees: M. Ilievski, M. Ilievski (MKD)
16 August 2024; 14:30	1× (yellow card) 4× (suspension)	Report		Verde Complex, Podgorica; Referees: M. Ilievski, M. Ilievski (MKD)

=== 15th place game ===
17 August 2024; 17:00	Faroe Islands	26–24	Austria	Bemax Arena, Podgorica; Referees: Radcenko, Persis (LAT)
17 August 2024; 17:00	Egholm 7	(11–13)	Fritsch 7	Bemax Arena, Podgorica; Referees: Radcenko, Persis (LAT)
17 August 2024; 17:00	2× (suspension)	Report	1× (yellow card) 3× (suspension)	Bemax Arena, Podgorica; Referees: Radcenko, Persis (LAT)

=== 13th place game ===
17 August 2024; 19:30	Croatia	30–29	Czech Republic	Bemax Arena, Podgorica; Referees: Doychinov Goretsov (BUL)
17 August 2024; 19:30	Grubišić 9	(17–13)	Skopar 10	Bemax Arena, Podgorica; Referees: Doychinov Goretsov (BUL)
17 August 2024; 19:30	1× (yellow card) 2× (suspension)	Report	1× (yellow card) 1× (suspension)	Bemax Arena, Podgorica; Referees: Doychinov Goretsov (BUL)

9th place bracket

9th–12th place semifinals
16 August
France	27
Portugal	30
16 August
Slovenia (Pen.)	30
Switzerland	29

9th place
18 August
Portugal	31
Slovenia	34
11th place
18 August
France	31
Switzerland	32

=== 9–12th place semifinals ===
16 August 2024; 17:00	France	27–30	Portugal	Verde Complex, Podgorica; Referees: Jakovljevic, Sando Kovacevic (SRB)
16 August 2024; 17:00	Peyrabout 8	(9–13)	Sousa 6	Verde Complex, Podgorica; Referees: Jakovljevic, Sando Kovacevic (SRB)
16 August 2024; 17:00	2× (yellow card) 4× (suspension)	Report	2× (yellow card) 7× (suspension)	Verde Complex, Podgorica; Referees: Jakovljevic, Sando Kovacevic (SRB)

16 August 2024
19:30
Slovenia
30–29
Switzerland
Verde Complex, Podgorica
Referees: Härgin, Makejev (EST)
Šcuka 6
(13–12)
Fuchs 6
2× (suspension)
Report

FT: 26–26 Pen: 4–3

=== 11th place game ===
18 August 2024; 12:00	France	31–32	Switzerland	Verde Complex, Podgorica; Referees: M. Ilievski, M. Ilievski (MKD)
18 August 2024; 12:00	Gendronneau 10	(12–17)	Köchli 7	Verde Complex, Podgorica; Referees: M. Ilievski, M. Ilievski (MKD)
18 August 2024; 12:00	1× (suspension)	Report	1× (yellow card) 2× (suspension)	Verde Complex, Podgorica; Referees: M. Ilievski, M. Ilievski (MKD)

=== 9th place game ===
18 August 2024; 14:30	Portugal	31–34	Slovenia	Verde Complex, Podgorica; Referees: Borge, Nygren (NOR)
18 August 2024; 14:30	Sousa 9	(12–17)	four players 5	Verde Complex, Podgorica; Referees: Borge, Nygren (NOR)
18 August 2024; 14:30	1× (yellow card) 9× (suspension)	Report	2× (suspension)	Verde Complex, Podgorica; Referees: Borge, Nygren (NOR)

5th place bracket

5–8th place semifinals
16 August
Germany	42
Norway	28
16 August
Spain	34
Serbia (Pen.)	35

5th place
18 August
Germany	29
Serbia	23
7th place
18 August
Norway	38
Spain	37

=== 5–8th place semifinals ===
16 August 2024; 12:00	Germany	42–28	Norway	Bemax Arena, Podgorica; Referees: Fotakidis, Kintazidis (GRE)
16 August 2024; 12:00	Strobel 8	(23–14)	Tønnesen 6	Bemax Arena, Podgorica; Referees: Fotakidis, Kintazidis (GRE)
16 August 2024; 12:00	1× (suspension) 1× (red card)	Report	1× (yellow card) 1× (suspension) 1× (red card)	Bemax Arena, Podgorica; Referees: Fotakidis, Kintazidis (GRE)

16 August 2024
14:30
Spain
34–35
Serbia
Bemax Arena, Podgorica
Referees: Radcenko, Persis (LAT)
Fis 8
(15–13)
Jokić, Cenić 9
2× (suspension)
Report
1× (yellow card) 6× (suspension)

FT: 31–31 Pen: 3–4

=== 7th place game ===
18 August 2024; 12:00	Norway	38–37	Spain	Bemax Arena, Podgorica; Referees: Kaludjerovic, Vujacic (MNE)
18 August 2024; 12:00	Tønnesen 10	(18–17)	Rocas 11	Bemax Arena, Podgorica; Referees: Kaludjerovic, Vujacic (MNE)
18 August 2024; 12:00	1× (yellow card) 3× (suspension)	Report	1× (yellow card) 4× (suspension) 1× (red card)	Bemax Arena, Podgorica; Referees: Kaludjerovic, Vujacic (MNE)

=== 5th place game ===
18 August 2024; 14:30	Germany	29–23	Serbia	Bemax Arena, Podgorica; Referees: Murariu, Paraschiv (ROM)
18 August 2024; 14:30	Mudrow 10	(18–11)	Draško 8	Bemax Arena, Podgorica; Referees: Murariu, Paraschiv (ROM)
18 August 2024; 14:30	3× (suspension)	Report	1× (yellow card) 4× (suspension)	Bemax Arena, Podgorica; Referees: Murariu, Paraschiv (ROM)

== Knockout stage ==
Semifinals
16 August
Denmark	34
Iceland	26
16 August
Sweden	39
Hungary	27

Final
18 August
Denmark	36
Sweden (ET)	37
Third place
18 August
Iceland	34
Hungary (ET)	36

=== Semifinals ===
16 August 2024; 17:00	Denmark	34–26	Iceland	Bemax Arena, Podgorica; Referees: Doychinov, Gorestov (BUL)
16 August 2024; 17:00	Jakobsen 8	(18–9)	Heimmison 9	Bemax Arena, Podgorica; Referees: Doychinov, Gorestov (BUL)
16 August 2024; 17:00		Report	5× (suspension)	Bemax Arena, Podgorica; Referees: Doychinov, Gorestov (BUL)

16 August 2024; 19:30	Sweden	39–27	Hungary	Bemax Arena, Podgorica; Referees: Kaludjerovic, Vujacic (MNE)
16 August 2024; 19:30	Roganovic 8	(17–15)	Fazekas, Mészáros 5	Bemax Arena, Podgorica; Referees: Kaludjerovic, Vujacic (MNE)
16 August 2024; 19:30	1× (suspension)	Report	3× (suspension)	Bemax Arena, Podgorica; Referees: Kaludjerovic, Vujacic (MNE)

=== Third place game ===
18 August 2024
17:30
Iceland
34–36 (ET)
Hungary
Bemax Arena, Podgorica
Referees: Fotakidis, Kinatzidis (GRE)
Halldórsson 8
(16–15)
Eklemovic 7
1× (yellow card) 3× (suspension) 1× (red card)
Report
3× (suspension) 1× (red card)

FT: 32–32 ET: 2–4

=== Final ===
18 August 2024
19:30
Denmark
36–37 (ET)
Sweden
Bemax Arena, Podgorica
Referees: Ayalgas, Zaragueta (ESP)
Sunesen 10
(12–17)
Roganovic 6
1× (yellow card) 2× (suspension)
Report
1× (suspension)

FT: 29–29 ET: 7–8

== Final ranking ==
Rank	Team
1st place, gold medalist(s)	Sweden
2nd place, silver medalist(s)	Denmark
3rd place, bronze medalist(s)	Hungary
4	Iceland
5	Germany
6	Serbia
7	Norway
8	Spain
9	Slovenia
10	Portugal
11	Switzerland
12	France
13	Croatia
14	Czech Republic
15	Faroe Islands
16	Austria
17	Israel
18	Poland
19	North Macedonia
20	Greece
21	Italy
22	Romania
23	Montenegro
24	Ukraine

Team qualified for the 2025 Men's Youth World Handball Championship

== Awards ==
Award	Player
Most Valuable Player	Nikola Roganovic (SWE)
Best Defence Player	Máté Fazekas (HUN)
Topscorer	Asaf Sharon (ISR) (79 goals)

All-Star Team

Position	Player
Goalkeeper	Frederik Møller Wolff (DEN)
Right wing	Hugo Vila (ESP)
Right back	Oskar Møller Jakobsen (DEN)
Centre back	Dagur Árni Heimisson (ISL)
Left back	Đorđe Draško (SRB)
Left wing	Yoni Peyrabout (FRA)
Pivot	Bennet Strobel (GER)

== See also ==
- 2024 European Men's U-20 Handball Championship
- 2024 Men's U-18 EHF Championship I
- 2024 Men's U-18 EHF Championship II
- 2025 IHF Men's U19 Handball World Championship
- 2025 IHF Men's U21 Handball World Championship
