= Máté Mészáros =

Hungarian handball player (born 2007)

Personal information
- Nationality: Hungarian
- Born: 15 January 2007 (age 19) Budapest, Hungary
- Height: 1.93 m (6 ft 4 in)

Sport
- Sport: Handball
- Position: Pivot
- Current club: NEKA
- Number: 14

Youth career
- Years: Team
- 2014–2015: Csanádi KSI SE
- 2015–2018: Pumukli KUA
- 2018–2023: Ferencvárosi TC

Senior clubs
- Years: Team
- 2023–: (Hungary) Ferencvárosi TC
- 2024–2025: → (Hungary) OTP Bank - Pick Szeged U21 (loan)
- 2025–: → (Hungary) NEKA (loan)
National team
Years	Team	Apps	(Gls)
2026–	Hungary	2	(3)
Medal record
Junior European Championship
Gold medal – first place	2026 Romania
European Youth Championship
Bronze medal – third place	2024 Montenegro

Máté Mészáros (born 15 January 2007) is a Hungarian handball player who plays for NEKA and the Hungarian national team.

== Career ==
=== Club ===
Máté started his career at Csanádi KSI SE. He joined the youth setup at Ferencvárosi TC in 2018, progressed through the various age-group teams, and made his debut for the senior side during the 2023/24 season. This season, he also made his debut in the EHF European Cup, scoring 3 goals against the Cypriot side Parnassos Strovolou. He played 3 matches in the EHF European Cup, scoring a total of 7 goals. In the spring of 2024, he made his first appearance in the Nemzeti Bajnokság I against OTP Bank - Pick Szeged, scoring 1 goal. In total, during the 2023/24 season, he scored 4 goals in 3 Nemzeti Bajnokság I matches. He spent the 2024/25 season on loan with OTP Bank - Pick Szeged U21 team in the Nemzeti Bajnokság I/B. Since the 2025/26 season, he has been playing on loan for the Nemzeti Bajnokság I team NEKA.

=== National team ===
In 2024, he won a bronze medal at the Youth European Championship. The captain of the Hungarian national team, Chema Rodríguez, also noticed his performance, who invited him to practice with the national team from September 30 to October 4, 2024, and then invited him to train with the national team between December 12 and December 17, 2025. He was 7th with the Hungarian team at the 2025 World Youth Championship. He participated in the 2026 Junior European Championship, where Hungary won the gold medal. Máté was chosen as the best defensive player of the tournament. On 5 November 2026, he made his debut in the senior national team in Tatabánya in the Hungary-Montenegro men's European qualifying match 32-21 (he scored 1 goals).

== Personal life ==
He has a twin brother, Márk Mészáros, who plays as a playmaker. He is also a professional handball player.

== Honours ==
=== National team ===
- Junior European Championship:
  - Gold: 2026
- Youth European Championship:
  - Bronze: 2024

=== Individual ===
- Best Defender in the Junior European Championship: 2026
