= Márkó Eklemovic =

Hungarian handball player (born 2007

Personal information
- Nationality: Hungarian
- Born: 4 October 2007 (age 19) Telki, Hungary
- Height: 1.82 m (6 ft 0 in)

Sport
- Sport: Handball
- Position: Centre back
- Current club: Győri ETO-UNI FKC
- Number: 24

Youth career
- Years: Team
- 2015–2020: Éles KISE
- 2020–2021: Telekom Veszprém
- 2021–2023: BFKA-Veszprém

Senior clubs
- Years: Team
- 2023–2025: (Hungary) MOL-Tatabánya KC
- 2023: → (Hungary) Tatai AC (loan)
- 2024–2025: → (Hungary) NEKA (loan)
- 2025–2026: (Hungary) Győri ETO-UNI FKC
- 2026–: (Hungary) OTP Bank – Pick Szeged
- 2026–: → (Hungary) Győri ETO-UNI FKC (loan)
Medal record
Junior European Championship
Gold medal – first place	2026 Romania
European Youth Olympic Festival
Bronze medal – third place	2023 Slovenia
European Youth Championship
Bronze medal – third place	2024 Montenegro

Márkó Eklemovic (born 4 October 2007 in Telki) is a Hungarian handball player who plays for Győri ETO-UNI FKC. He has Serbian origins thanks to his father, Nikola Eklemović, a former handball player who played in the Serbian and the Hungarian national handball teams.

== Career ==
=== Club ===
Marko started his career at Éles KISE. In the 2020/21 season, he played in the reserves of Telekom Veszprém. Then he went to the Balaton-Felvidék Handball Academy (BFKA-Veszprém). In October 2022, shortly after his 15th birthday, he played his first senior match for BFKA-Veszprém in the third round of the Hungarian Cup, when he scored 6 goals against Budakalász FKC. In the spring of 2023, it was announced that he would transfer to the No. 3 Hungarian team, MOL-Tatabánya KC. In September 2023, he made his debut in Nemzeti Bajnokság I and in the MOL-Tatabánya KC senior team: PLER-Budapest-MOL-Tatabánya KC 19–27, Márkó scored 1 goal. He also made his debut in the EHF European League, where he scored 5 goals in 3 matches. After the first few matches of the 2024/2025 season, he was loaned to the NEKA team at his own request in order to get more playing time and development. He started the 2025/2026 season again with MOL-Tatabánya KC, but after 3 matches he transferred to Győri ETO-UNI FKC. In the spring of 2026, it was announced that he would transfer to the No. 2 Hungarian team, OTP Bank – Pick Szeged. He will spend the 2026/2027 season on loan at Győri ETO-UNI FKC.

=== National team ===
In 2023, he won a bronze medal at the European Youth Olympic Festival. He scored 30 goals in 5 matches. In the bronze match, Hungary-Croatia won 43–42, where Márkó scored 12 goals. In 2024, he won a bronze medal at the Youth European Championship. He scored 34 goals in 8 matches. In the bronze match, Hungary-Iceland won 36–34, where Márkó scored 7 goals. He was 7th with the Hungarian team at the 2025 World Youth Championship. He scored 47 goals in 8 matches. The captain of the Hungarian national team, Chema Rodríguez, also noticed his performance, who invited him to practice with the national team from December 12 to December 17, 2025. He participated in the 2026 Junior European Championship, where Hungary won the gold medal and was also chosen as the best centre back of the tournament.

== Personal life ==
His father, Nikola Eklemović, is a former handball player who also played in the Serbian and later the Hungarian national handball teams.

== Honours ==
=== National team ===
- Junior European Championship:
  - Gold: 2026
- European Youth Olympic Festival (EYOF):
  - Bronze: 2023
- Youth European Championship:
  - Bronze: 2024

=== Club ===
MOL Tatabánya KC

- Nemzeti Bajnokság I
  - Bronze: 2024

=== Individual ===
- All-Star Centre Back of the Junior European Championship: 2026
