= Máté Fazekas =

Hungarian handball player (born 2006)

Personal information
- Full name: Máté Fazekas
- Nationality: Hungarian
- Born: 14 September 2006 (age 20) Gummersbach, Germany
- Height: 1.97 m (6 ft 6 in)

Sport
- Sport: Handball
- Position: Left back
- Current club: OTP Bank-Pick Szeged
- Number: 13

Youth career
- Years: Team
- 2014–2016: Éles KISE
- 2016–2017: Veszprém KKFT Felsőörs
- 2017–2022: Éles KISE

Senior clubs
- Years: Team
- 2022–2024: Fejér B.Á.L. Veszprém
- 2024–10/2025: Győri ETO-UNI FKC
- 10/2025–: OTP Bank-Pick Szeged
National team
Years	Team	Apps	(Gls)
2026–	Hungary	1	(1)
Medal record
Junior European Championship
Gold medal – first place	2026 Romania
European Youth Olympic Festival
Bronze medal – third place	2023 Slovenia
European Youth Championship
Bronze medal – third place	2024 Montenegro

Máté Fazekas (born 14 September 2006) is a Hungarian handball player who plays for OTP-Bank Pick Szeged and the Hungarian national team.

== Career ==
=== Club ===
Máté started his career at Éles KISE. In the 2016/17 season, he played in the reserves of Veszprém KKFT Felsőörs. From 2017, he played again in Éles KISE. In 2022, he returned to Veszprémi KKFT, where he won the Nemzeti Bajnokság II championship with the Veszprémi KKFT U23 team and they were promoted to Nemzeti Bajnokság I/B. In October 2023, he made his debut in Nemzeti Bajnokság I and in the Fejér B.Á.L. Veszprém senior team: Fejér B.Á.L. Veszprém-Carbonex-Komló 25–29, Máté scored 7 goal. This season, he played in 9 Nemzeti Bajnokság I matches, scoring 18 goals. In 2024, after 10 years, he left Veszprém and joined the Győri ETO-UNI FKC team, and returned to the Nemzeti Bajnokság I. He started the 2025/2026 season again with Győri ETO-UNI FKC, but after 4 matches he transferred to OTP-Bank Pick Szeged.

=== National team ===
In 2023, he won a bronze medal at the European Youth Olympic Festival. In the bronze match, Hungary-Croatia won 43–42. In 2024, he won a bronze medal at the Youth European Championship. He scored 33 goals in 8 matches. In the bronze match, Hungary-Iceland won 36–34, where Máté scored 5 goals. Máté was chosen as the best defensive player of the tournament. The captain of the Hungarian national team, Chema Rodríguez, also noticed his performance, who invited him to practice with the national team from September 30 to October 4, 2024. He was 7th with the Hungarian team at the 2025 World Youth Championship. He was included in the large squad of the 2026 European Men's Handball Championship, but in the end he will not become a member of the narrow squad. He participated in the 2026 Junior European Championship, where Hungary won the gold medal. On 8 November 2026, he made his debut in the senior national team in Ferizaj in the Kosovo-Hungary men's European qualifying match 20-34 (he scored 1 goals).

== Personal life ==
His father, Nándor Fazekas, is a former handball player who played in the Hungary national team. His brother, Gergő Fazekas, plays as a centre back and is also a Hungary national team player.

== Honours ==
=== National team ===
- Junior European Championship:
  - Gold: 2026
- European Youth Olympic Festival (EYOF):
  - Bronze: 2023
- Youth European Championship:
  - Bronze: 2024

=== Club ===
Pick Szeged

- Nemzeti Bajnokság I
  - Silver: 2026
- Magyar Kupa
  - Bronze: 2026
- Hungarian Supercup
  - Silver: 2026

=== Individual ===
- Best Defender in the Youth European Championship: 2024
- Hungarian Youth Handball Player of the Year: 2024
