= Julio Fis =

Spanish handball player (born 1974)

Personal information
- Full name: Julio Fis Rousseduy
- Nationality: Cuban, Spanish
- Born: 28 October 1974 (age 51) Guantánamo, Cuba

Sport
- Sport: Handball
- Position: Left-back

Senior clubs
- Years: Team
- –1997: Guantánamo
- 1997–1998: Győri ETO KC
- 1998–1999: Nyíregyházi KSE
- 1999–2000: Bidasoa Irun
- 2000–2001: BM Ciudad Real
- 2001–2002: THW Kiel
- 2002–2005: BM Valladolid
- 2005–2007: BM Ciudad Real
- 2007–2008: CB Ciudad de Logroño
National team
Years	Team	Apps	
–	Cuba	28	
2005–2006	Spain	23	(47)

Julio Fis Rousseduy (born 28 October 1974) is a former handball player who played as a left-back. Born in Cuba, he played for the Cuba and the Spain national teams.

== Clubs ==
- Győri ETO KC (Hungary)
- Nyíregyháza (Hungary)
- CD Bidasoa (Spain)
- BM Ciudad Real (Spain)
- THW Kiel (Germany)
- BM Valladolid (Spain)
- BM Ciudad Real (Spain)
- CB Ciudad de Logroño (Spain)

== National team ==
- Cuba: ? caps in the 1990s
- Spain: 23 caps and 47 goals between 2005 and 2006

== Trophies ==
- German Championship: 2002
- EHF Cup: 2002
- Spanish League Cup: 2005, 2006
- Spanish Cup: 2005
- EHF Champions League: 2006

== Private ==
His son, Marcos Fis, is also a professional handball player for the Spanish national team.
