= Turda Arena =

Arena in Turda, Romania

- Location: Turda, Romania
- Owner: City of Turda
- Capacity: 3,183
- Type: Arena

Construction
- Groundbreaking: September 2020
- Opened: September 2022 (tentative)
- Cost: €18 million
- Architects: Prodesign Engineering & Construction
- General contractor: ACI Cluj

Tenant
- AHC Potaissa Turda (Liga Zimbrilor) (2022–)

The Turda Arena is a multi-purpose arena currently under construction in Turda, Romania.
