= Faroe Islands men's national junior handball team =

Faroe Islands

Information
- Association: Handball Federation of the Faroe Islands

Colours
1st	2nd

Results

IHF U-21 World Championship
- Appearances: 3 (First in 2017)
- Best result: 3rd (2025)

European Junior Championship
- Appearances: 3 (First in 2022)
- Best result: 10th (2022)
- Last updated on Unknown.

The Faroe Islands national junior handball team is the national under-21 handball team of Faroe Islands. Controlled by the Handball Federation of the Faroe Islands, it represents Faroe Islands in international matches. They first qualified for the IHF Men's Junior World Championship in 2017, and for the second time 2023. They played their first European Junior Championship in 2022, ending 10th.

== Statistics ==
=== IHF Junior World Championship record ===
Champions Runners up Third place Fourth place

Year	Round	Position	GP	W	D	L	GS	GA	GD
1977 (Sweden)	Didn't Qualify								
1979 (Denmark) (Sweden)	Didn't Qualify								
1981 (Portugal)	Didn't Qualify								
1983 (Finland)	Didn't Qualify								
1985 (Italy)	Didn't Qualify								
1987 (Socialist Federal Republic of Yugoslavia)	Didn't Qualify								
1989 (Spain)	Didn't Qualify								
1991 (Greece)	Didn't Qualify								
1993 (Egypt)	Didn't Qualify								
1995 (Argentina)	Didn't Qualify								
1997 (Turkey)	Didn't Qualify								
1999 (Qatar)	Didn't Qualify								
2001 (Switzerland)	Didn't Qualify								
2003 (Brazil)	Didn't Qualify								
2005 (Hungary)	Didn't Qualify								
2007 (North Macedonia)	Didn't Qualify								
2009 (Egypt)	Didn't Qualify								
2011 (Greece)	Didn't Qualify								
2013 (Bosnia and Herzegovina)	Didn't Qualify								
2015 (Brazil)	Didn't Qualify								
2017 (Algeria)	Round of 16	16th place	6	2	0	4			
2019 (Spain)	Didn't Qualify								
2023 (Germany) (Greece)	Quarterfinals	7th place	8	6	0	2			
2025 (Poland)	Semi Finals	3rd place	9	6	1	2			
Total	3/24	0 Titles							

=== EHF European Junior Championship ===
Champions Runners up Third place Fourth place

European Junior Championship record
Year	Round	Position	GP	W	D	L	GS	GA	GD
(Romania) 1996	Didn't Qualify								
(Austria) 1998	Didn't Qualify								
(Greece) 2000	Didn't Qualify								
(Poland) 2002	Didn't Qualify								
(Latvia) 2004	Didn't Qualify								
(Austria) 2006	Didn't Qualify								
(Romania) 2008	Didn't Qualify								
(Slovakia) 2010	Didn't Qualify								
(Turkey) 2012	Didn't Qualify								
(Austria) 2014	Didn't Qualify								
(Denmark) 2016	Didn't Qualify								
(Slovenia) 2018	Didn't Qualify								
(Portugal) 2022	Intermediate round	10th place							
(Slovenia) 2024	Elimination round	18th place							
(Romania) 2026	Main round	12th place							
Total	3/15	0 Titles							
