= Marcos Fis Ballester =

Spanish handball player (born 2007)

Marcos Fis
Personal information
- Full name: Marcos Fis Ballester
- Nationality: Spanish
- Born: 1 March 2007 (age 19) Ciudad Real, Spain
- Height: 1.92 m (6 ft 4 in)

Sport
- Sport: Handball
- Position: Right back
- Current club: BM Granollers
- Number: 11

Senior clubs
- Years: Team
- 2023–2024: Alarcos Ciudad Real
- 2024–2025: CB Ciudad Real
- 2025–: BM Granollers
National team
Years	Team	Apps	(Gls)
2025–	Spain	3	(10)
- Updated on 18 December 2025

Marcos Fis Ballester (born 1 March 2007) is a Spanish handball player for BM Granollers.

== Career ==
Fis started his career at Alarcos Ciudad Real, before switching to the local 2nd league team CB Ciudad Real in 2024. In his first season he helped the club getting promoted to the Liga ASOBAL, The following summer he joined BM Granollers on a contract until 2027.

At the 2025 IHF Men's U19 Handball World Championship Fis won silver medals with Spain, and won the tournament MVP award. He made his debut for the Spanish senior national team on 11 May 2025 against Latvia in a qualification match for the European Championship. He then represented Spain at the 2026 European Men's Handball Championship, where Spain finished 11th.

== Private ==
His father Julio Fis is a former professional handball player.
