= 2015 Men's Youth World Handball Championship =

International handball tournament held in Russia

Tournament details
- Host country: Russia
- Venues: 2 (in 1 host city)
- Dates: 7 – 20 August 2015
- Teams: 24 (from 4 confederations)

Final positions
- Champions: France (1st title)
- Runners-up: Slovenia
- Third place: Iceland
- Fourth place: Spain

Tournament statistics
- Matches played: 92
- Goals scored: 5,178 (56.28 per match)
- Top scorers: (Slovenia) Blaž Janc (69 goals)

Awards
- Best player: (France) Melvyn Richardson

The 2015 Men's Youth World Handball Championship was the sixth edition of the IHF Men's Youth World Championship, held in Yekaterinburg, Russia from 7 to 20 August 2015. France won their first title by defeating Slovenia 33–26 in the final.

== Qualified teams ==
The Oceania Federation withdrew, Serbia was named the replacement.

Europe

- Croatia
- Denmark
- France
- Germany
- Hungary
- Iceland
- Norway
- Poland
- Russia (Host)
- Serbia
- Slovenia
- Spain
- Sweden
- Switzerland

Africa

- Algeria
- Egypt
- Tunisia

America

- Argentina
- Brazil
- Chile
- Venezuela

Asia

- Japan
- Qatar
- South Korea

== Preliminary round ==
The draw was held on 13 May 2015.

All times are local (UTC+5).

=== Group A ===
| Pos | Team | Pld | W | D | L | GF | GA | GD | Pts | Qualification |
|---|---|---|---|---|---|---|---|---|---|---|
| 1 | Sweden | 5 | 4 | 1 | 0 | 163 | 115 | +48 | 9 | Advanced to knockout stage |
| 2 | Hungary | 5 | 3 | 1 | 1 | 171 | 129 | +42 | 7 | Advanced to knockout stage |
| 3 | Serbia | 5 | 3 | 0 | 2 | 141 | 148 | −7 | 6 | Advanced to knockout stage |
| 4 | South Korea | 5 | 2 | 1 | 2 | 152 | 147 | +5 | 5 | Advanced to knockout stage |
| 5 | Poland | 5 | 1 | 1 | 3 | 130 | 134 | −4 | 3 | |
| 6 | Chile | 5 | 0 | 0 | 5 | 88 | 172 | −84 | 0 | |

Source: IHF.info
Rules for classification: 1) points; 2) head-to-head points; 3) head-to-head goal difference; 4) head-to-head number of goals scored; 5) Goal difference.

| 8 August 2015; 10:00 | Hungary | 35–26 | Poland | KRK Uralets, Yekaterinburg; Attendance: 100; Referees: Grillo, Lenci (ARG) |
| 8 August 2015; 10:00 | Fekete 8 | (18–11) | Moryto 5 | KRK Uralets, Yekaterinburg; Attendance: 100; Referees: Grillo, Lenci (ARG) |
| 8 August 2015; 10:00 | 3× (yellow card) 4× (suspension) | Report | 3× (yellow card) 3× (suspension) | KRK Uralets, Yekaterinburg; Attendance: 100; Referees: Grillo, Lenci (ARG) |

| 8 August 2015; 12:00 | Sweden | 34–24 | Serbia | KRK Uralets, Yekaterinburg; Attendance: 100; Referees: Bethmann, Tzaferopoulos (GRE) |
| 8 August 2015; 12:00 | Mellegård 6 | (14–10) | Jovanović, Rakocija 4 | KRK Uralets, Yekaterinburg; Attendance: 100; Referees: Bethmann, Tzaferopoulos (GRE) |
| 8 August 2015; 12:00 | 3× (yellow card) 3× (suspension) | Report | 3× (yellow card) 6× (suspension) | KRK Uralets, Yekaterinburg; Attendance: 100; Referees: Bethmann, Tzaferopoulos (GRE) |

| 8 August 2015; 14:00 | South Korea | 36–23 | Chile | KRK Uralets, Yekaterinburg; Attendance: 100; Referees: Bartlett, Stokes (GBR) |
| 8 August 2015; 14:00 | Jung Hyun-jin 6 | (19–11) | Hernández 6 | KRK Uralets, Yekaterinburg; Attendance: 100; Referees: Bartlett, Stokes (GBR) |
| 8 August 2015; 14:00 | 3× (yellow card) 6× (suspension) | Report | 1× (yellow card) 2× (suspension) | KRK Uralets, Yekaterinburg; Attendance: 100; Referees: Bartlett, Stokes (GBR) |

| 10 August 2015; 16:00 | Poland | 23–23 | Sweden | KRK Uralets, Yekaterinburg; Attendance: 80; Referees: Mitrović, Vešović (MNE) |
| 10 August 2015; 16:00 | Kowalczyk 8 | (13–11) | Claar 5 | KRK Uralets, Yekaterinburg; Attendance: 80; Referees: Mitrović, Vešović (MNE) |
| 10 August 2015; 16:00 | 3× (yellow card) 3× (suspension) | Report | 3× (yellow card) 2× (suspension) | KRK Uralets, Yekaterinburg; Attendance: 80; Referees: Mitrović, Vešović (MNE) |

| 10 August 2015; 18:00 | Chile | 17–37 | Hungary | KRK Uralets, Yekaterinburg; Attendance: 100; Referees: Hussein, Imran (IRQ) |
| 10 August 2015; 18:00 | Paulsen 5 | (4–17) | Hanusz, Mikita 6 | KRK Uralets, Yekaterinburg; Attendance: 100; Referees: Hussein, Imran (IRQ) |
| 10 August 2015; 18:00 | 3× (yellow card) 4× (suspension) | Report | 3× (yellow card) 6× (suspension) | KRK Uralets, Yekaterinburg; Attendance: 100; Referees: Hussein, Imran (IRQ) |

| 10 August 2015; 20:00 | Serbia | 29–27 | South Korea | KRK Uralets, Yekaterinburg; Attendance: 150; Referees: Honda, Tabuchi (JPN) |
| 10 August 2015; 20:00 | Jovanović 7 | (13–13) | Kang Seok-ju 5 | KRK Uralets, Yekaterinburg; Attendance: 150; Referees: Honda, Tabuchi (JPN) |
| 10 August 2015; 20:00 | 3× (yellow card) 8× (suspension) 1× (red card) | Report | 3× (yellow card) 4× (suspension) | KRK Uralets, Yekaterinburg; Attendance: 150; Referees: Honda, Tabuchi (JPN) |

| 11 August 2015; 16:00 | Hungary | 42–29 | Serbia | KRK Uralets, Yekaterinburg; Attendance: 200; Referees: Kiselev, Kiyashko (RUS) |
| 11 August 2015; 16:00 | Fekete, Győri 7 | (21–15) | Ranisavljević 7 | KRK Uralets, Yekaterinburg; Attendance: 200; Referees: Kiselev, Kiyashko (RUS) |
| 11 August 2015; 16:00 | 3× (yellow card) 3× (suspension) | Report | 2× (yellow card) 2× (suspension) 1× (red card) | KRK Uralets, Yekaterinburg; Attendance: 200; Referees: Kiselev, Kiyashko (RUS) |

| 11 August 2015; 18:00 | Sweden | 37–25 | South Korea | KRK Uralets, Yekaterinburg; Attendance: 100; Referees: Brunner, Salah (SUI) |
| 11 August 2015; 18:00 | three players 6 | (20–12) | Kim Yeon-bin, Park Kwang-soon 5 | KRK Uralets, Yekaterinburg; Attendance: 100; Referees: Brunner, Salah (SUI) |
| 11 August 2015; 18:00 | 4× (yellow card) 6× (suspension) 1× (red card) | Report | 3× (yellow card) 4× (suspension) | KRK Uralets, Yekaterinburg; Attendance: 100; Referees: Brunner, Salah (SUI) |

| 11 August 2015; 20:00 | Poland | 28–16 | Chile | KRK Uralets, Yekaterinburg; Attendance: 50; Referees: Diop, Faye (SEN) |
| 11 August 2015; 20:00 | Mauer 7 | (16–8) | Porta 7 | KRK Uralets, Yekaterinburg; Attendance: 50; Referees: Diop, Faye (SEN) |
| 11 August 2015; 20:00 | 1× (yellow card) 4× (suspension) | Report | 2× (yellow card) 4× (suspension) | KRK Uralets, Yekaterinburg; Attendance: 50; Referees: Diop, Faye (SEN) |

| 13 August 2015; 16:00 | Sweden | 39–17 | Chile | KRK Uralets, Yekaterinburg; Attendance: 50; Referees: Korja, Laitinen (FIN) |
| 13 August 2015; 16:00 | Bredolo 11 | (23–8) | Hernández, Hidalgo 3 | KRK Uralets, Yekaterinburg; Attendance: 50; Referees: Korja, Laitinen (FIN) |
| 13 August 2015; 16:00 | 2× (yellow card) 4× (suspension) | Report | 3× (yellow card) | KRK Uralets, Yekaterinburg; Attendance: 50; Referees: Korja, Laitinen (FIN) |

| 13 August 2015; 18:00 | South Korea | 31–31 | Hungary | KRK Uralets, Yekaterinburg; Attendance: 100; Referees: Konjičanin, Konjičanin (BIH) |
| 13 August 2015; 18:00 | Kim Yeon-bin, Park Se-ung 6 | (18–19) | Győri 13 | KRK Uralets, Yekaterinburg; Attendance: 100; Referees: Konjičanin, Konjičanin (BIH) |
| 13 August 2015; 18:00 | 3× (yellow card) 5× (suspension) | Report | 3× (yellow card) 7× (suspension) | KRK Uralets, Yekaterinburg; Attendance: 100; Referees: Konjičanin, Konjičanin (BIH) |

| 13 August 2015; 20:00 | Serbia | 27–26 | Poland | KRK Uralets, Yekaterinburg; Attendance: 80; Referees: Brunner, Salah (SUI) |
| 13 August 2015; 20:00 | Arsenić 6 | (14–13) | Kowalczyk, Netz 6 | KRK Uralets, Yekaterinburg; Attendance: 80; Referees: Brunner, Salah (SUI) |
| 13 August 2015; 20:00 | 3× (yellow card) 4× (suspension) | Report | 3× (yellow card) 4× (suspension) | KRK Uralets, Yekaterinburg; Attendance: 80; Referees: Brunner, Salah (SUI) |

| 14 August 2015; 16:00 | Chile | 19–32 | Serbia | KRK Uralets, Yekaterinburg; Attendance: 50; Referees: Brunner, Salah (SUI) |
| 14 August 2015; 16:00 | Paulsen 5 | (6–18) | Arsenić 8 | KRK Uralets, Yekaterinburg; Attendance: 50; Referees: Brunner, Salah (SUI) |
| 14 August 2015; 16:00 | 3× (yellow card) 1× (suspension) | Report | 3× (yellow card) 3× (suspension) | KRK Uralets, Yekaterinburg; Attendance: 50; Referees: Brunner, Salah (SUI) |

| 14 August 2015; 18:00 | South Korea | 33–27 | Poland | KRK Uralets, Yekaterinburg; Attendance: 100; Referees: Mitrović, Vešović (MNE) |
| 14 August 2015; 18:00 | Kim Yeon-bin 8 | (14–12) | Moryto 6 | KRK Uralets, Yekaterinburg; Attendance: 100; Referees: Mitrović, Vešović (MNE) |
| 14 August 2015; 18:00 | 3× (yellow card) 1× (suspension) | Report | 3× (yellow card) 5× (suspension) | KRK Uralets, Yekaterinburg; Attendance: 100; Referees: Mitrović, Vešović (MNE) |

| 14 August 2015; 20:00 | Hungary | 26–30 | Sweden | KRK Uralets, Yekaterinburg; Attendance: 150; Referees: Kiselev, Kiyashko (RUS) |
| 14 August 2015; 20:00 | Juhász 9 | (12–13) | Claar 8 | KRK Uralets, Yekaterinburg; Attendance: 150; Referees: Kiselev, Kiyashko (RUS) |
| 14 August 2015; 20:00 | 2× (yellow card) 3× (suspension) | Report | 2× (yellow card) 3× (suspension) | KRK Uralets, Yekaterinburg; Attendance: 150; Referees: Kiselev, Kiyashko (RUS) |

=== Group B ===
| Pos | Team | Pld | W | D | L | GF | GA | GD | Pts | Qualification |
|---|---|---|---|---|---|---|---|---|---|---|
| 1 | Iceland | 5 | 5 | 0 | 0 | 169 | 127 | +42 | 10 | Advanced to knockout stage |
| 2 | Spain | 5 | 3 | 0 | 2 | 145 | 99 | +46 | 6 (Note: Spain–Norway 21–19) | Advanced to knockout stage |
| 3 | Norway | 5 | 3 | 0 | 2 | 157 | 118 | +39 | 6 | Advanced to knockout stage |
| 4 | Egypt | 5 | 2 | 0 | 3 | 148 | 136 | +12 | 4 (Note: Germany–Egypt 23–24) | Advanced to knockout stage |
| 5 | Germany | 5 | 2 | 0 | 3 | 161 | 128 | +33 | 4 | |
| 6 | Venezuela | 5 | 0 | 0 | 5 | 85 | 257 | −172 | 0 | |

Source: IHF.info
Rules for classification: 1) points; 2) head-to-head points; 3) head-to-head goal difference; 4) head-to-head number of goals scored; 5) Goal difference.
Notes:

| 8 August 2015; 16:00 | Spain | 30–23 | Egypt | KRK Uralets, Yekaterinburg; Attendance: 100; Referees: Kiselev, Kiyashko (RUS) |
| 8 August 2015; 16:00 | D. Dujshebaev 8 | (10–11) | Khaled 8 | KRK Uralets, Yekaterinburg; Attendance: 100; Referees: Kiselev, Kiyashko (RUS) |
| 8 August 2015; 16:00 | 2× (yellow card) 3× (suspension) | Report | 3× (yellow card) 2× (suspension) | KRK Uralets, Yekaterinburg; Attendance: 100; Referees: Kiselev, Kiyashko (RUS) |

| 8 August 2015; 18:00 | Norway | 54–15 | Venezuela | KRK Uralets, Yekaterinburg; Attendance: 100; Referees: Hussein, Imran (IRQ) |
| 8 August 2015; 18:00 | Horgen 8 | (31–8) | Gotia 4 | KRK Uralets, Yekaterinburg; Attendance: 100; Referees: Hussein, Imran (IRQ) |
| 8 August 2015; 18:00 | 3× (yellow card) | Report | 3× (yellow card) 1× (suspension) | KRK Uralets, Yekaterinburg; Attendance: 100; Referees: Hussein, Imran (IRQ) |

| 8 August 2015; 20:00 | Germany | 26–34 | Iceland | KRK Uralets, Yekaterinburg; Attendance: 100; Referees: Korja, Laitinen (FIN) |
| 8 August 2015; 20:00 | Michalczik 5 | (11–20) | Ríkharðsson 8 | KRK Uralets, Yekaterinburg; Attendance: 100; Referees: Korja, Laitinen (FIN) |
| 8 August 2015; 20:00 | 4× (yellow card) 4× (suspension) | Report | 2× (yellow card) 3× (suspension) | KRK Uralets, Yekaterinburg; Attendance: 100; Referees: Korja, Laitinen (FIN) |

| 9 August 2015; 16:00 | Egypt | 21–24 | Norway | KRK Uralets, Yekaterinburg; Attendance: 50; Referees: Konjičanin, Konjičanin (BIH) |
| 9 August 2015; 16:00 | Raafat 6 | (8–13) | Ferkingstad 7 | KRK Uralets, Yekaterinburg; Attendance: 50; Referees: Konjičanin, Konjičanin (BIH) |
| 9 August 2015; 16:00 | 2× (yellow card) 3× (suspension) | Report | 4× (yellow card) 3× (suspension) | KRK Uralets, Yekaterinburg; Attendance: 50; Referees: Konjičanin, Konjičanin (BIH) |

| 9 August 2015; 18:00 | Iceland | 25–24 | Spain | KRK Uralets, Yekaterinburg; Attendance: 100; Referees: Brunner, Salah (SUI) |
| 9 August 2015; 18:00 | Magnússon 8 | (12–11) | Odriozola 6 | KRK Uralets, Yekaterinburg; Attendance: 100; Referees: Brunner, Salah (SUI) |
| 9 August 2015; 18:00 | 3× (yellow card) 3× (suspension) | Report | 3× (yellow card) 4× (suspension) | KRK Uralets, Yekaterinburg; Attendance: 100; Referees: Brunner, Salah (SUI) |

| 9 August 2015; 20:00 | Venezuela | 16–58 | Germany | KRK Uralets, Yekaterinburg; Attendance: 50; Referees: Diop, Faye (SEN) |
| 9 August 2015; 20:00 | Goitia 5 | (8–24) | Beyer 11 | KRK Uralets, Yekaterinburg; Attendance: 50; Referees: Diop, Faye (SEN) |
| 9 August 2015; 20:00 | 2× (yellow card) 5× (suspension) | Report | 3× (yellow card) 5× (suspension) | KRK Uralets, Yekaterinburg; Attendance: 50; Referees: Diop, Faye (SEN) |

| 11 August 2015; 10:00 | Spain | 47–7 | Venezuela | KRK Uralets, Yekaterinburg; Attendance: 50; Referees: Bartlett, Stokes (GBR) |
| 11 August 2015; 10:00 | Folques 8 | (21–5) | Goitia 4 | KRK Uralets, Yekaterinburg; Attendance: 50; Referees: Bartlett, Stokes (GBR) |
| 11 August 2015; 10:00 | 1× (yellow card) 1× (suspension) | Report | 2× (yellow card) 4× (suspension) 1× (red card) | KRK Uralets, Yekaterinburg; Attendance: 50; Referees: Bartlett, Stokes (GBR) |

| 11 August 2015; 12:00 | Norway | 31–29 | Germany | KRK Uralets, Yekaterinburg; Attendance: 100; Referees: Al-Watani, Qamber (BHR) |
| 11 August 2015; 12:00 | Horgen, Schoenningsen 7 | (13–16) | Mertens 7 | KRK Uralets, Yekaterinburg; Attendance: 100; Referees: Al-Watani, Qamber (BHR) |
| 11 August 2015; 12:00 | 4× (yellow card) 1× (suspension) | Report | 3× (yellow card) 5× (suspension) | KRK Uralets, Yekaterinburg; Attendance: 100; Referees: Al-Watani, Qamber (BHR) |

| 11 August 2015; 14:00 | Egypt | 29–31 | Iceland | KRK Uralets, Yekaterinburg; Attendance: 100; Referees: Grillo, Lenci (ARG) |
| 11 August 2015; 14:00 | Hassan, Mahmoud 6 | (12–18) | Ríkharðsson 8 | KRK Uralets, Yekaterinburg; Attendance: 100; Referees: Grillo, Lenci (ARG) |
| 11 August 2015; 14:00 | 2× (yellow card) 5× (suspension) | Report | 2× (yellow card) 4× (suspension) | KRK Uralets, Yekaterinburg; Attendance: 100; Referees: Grillo, Lenci (ARG) |

| 12 August 2015; 16:00 | Norway | 29–32 | Iceland | KRK Uralets, Yekaterinburg; Attendance: 100; Referees: Covaliuc, Covaliuc (MDA) |
| 12 August 2015; 16:00 | Kopp 7 | (17–16) | Magnússon 8 | KRK Uralets, Yekaterinburg; Attendance: 100; Referees: Covaliuc, Covaliuc (MDA) |
| 12 August 2015; 16:00 | 3× (yellow card) 5× (suspension) 1× (red card) | Report | 3× (yellow card) 3× (suspension) | KRK Uralets, Yekaterinburg; Attendance: 100; Referees: Covaliuc, Covaliuc (MDA) |

| 12 August 2015; 18:00 | Germany | 25–23 | Spain | KRK Uralets, Yekaterinburg; Attendance: 300; Referees: Kiselev, Kiyashko (RUS) |
| 12 August 2015; 18:00 | Mertens, Schade 5 | (14–9) | Bazán 4 | KRK Uralets, Yekaterinburg; Attendance: 300; Referees: Kiselev, Kiyashko (RUS) |
| 12 August 2015; 18:00 | 3× (yellow card) 3× (suspension) | Report | 4× (yellow card) 3× (suspension) | KRK Uralets, Yekaterinburg; Attendance: 300; Referees: Kiselev, Kiyashko (RUS) |

| 12 August 2015; 20:00 | Venezuela | 28–51 | Egypt | KRK Uralets, Yekaterinburg; Referees: Li, Liu (CHN) |
| 12 August 2015; 20:00 | Goitia 7 | (15–27) | Raafat 11 | KRK Uralets, Yekaterinburg; Referees: Li, Liu (CHN) |
| 12 August 2015; 20:00 | 2× (yellow card) 5× (suspension) | Report | 3× (yellow card) 2× (suspension) | KRK Uralets, Yekaterinburg; Referees: Li, Liu (CHN) |

| 14 August 2015; 10:00 | Iceland | 47–19 | Venezuela | KRK Uralets, Yekaterinburg; Attendance: 50; Referees: Hussein, Imran (IRQ) |
| 14 August 2015; 10:00 | Ríkharðsson 15 | (27–12) | Goitia 6 | KRK Uralets, Yekaterinburg; Attendance: 50; Referees: Hussein, Imran (IRQ) |
| 14 August 2015; 10:00 | 1× (yellow card) 1× (suspension) | Report | 3× (yellow card) 4× (suspension) | KRK Uralets, Yekaterinburg; Attendance: 50; Referees: Hussein, Imran (IRQ) |

| 14 August 2015; 12:00 | Germany | 23–24 | Egypt | KRK Uralets, Yekaterinburg; Attendance: 150; Referees: Covaliuc, Covaliuc (MDA) |
| 14 August 2015; 12:00 | Zintel 6 | (9–13) | Hassan 7 | KRK Uralets, Yekaterinburg; Attendance: 150; Referees: Covaliuc, Covaliuc (MDA) |
| 14 August 2015; 12:00 | 3× (yellow card) 2× (suspension) | Report | 3× (yellow card) 3× (suspension) | KRK Uralets, Yekaterinburg; Attendance: 150; Referees: Covaliuc, Covaliuc (MDA) |

| 14 August 2015; 14:00 | Spain | 21–19 | Norway | KRK Uralets, Yekaterinburg; Attendance: 150; Referees: Grillo, Lenci (ARG) |
| 14 August 2015; 14:00 | Odriozola 5 | (12–9) | Kopp 6 | KRK Uralets, Yekaterinburg; Attendance: 150; Referees: Grillo, Lenci (ARG) |
| 14 August 2015; 14:00 | 3× (yellow card) 2× (suspension) | Report | 2× (yellow card) 2× (suspension) | KRK Uralets, Yekaterinburg; Attendance: 150; Referees: Grillo, Lenci (ARG) |

=== Group C ===
| Pos | Team | Pld | W | D | L | GF | GA | GD | Pts | Qualification |
|---|---|---|---|---|---|---|---|---|---|---|
| 1 | Denmark | 5 | 4 | 1 | 0 | 158 | 115 | +43 | 9 | Advanced to knockout stage |
| 2 | Russia (H) | 5 | 3 | 1 | 1 | 163 | 149 | +14 | 7 | Advanced to knockout stage |
| 3 | Switzerland | 5 | 3 | 0 | 2 | 131 | 139 | −8 | 6 | Advanced to knockout stage |
| 4 | Croatia | 5 | 2 | 0 | 3 | 142 | 143 | −1 | 4 (Note: Croatia–Qatar 25–24) | Advanced to knockout stage |
| 5 | Qatar | 5 | 2 | 0 | 3 | 123 | 123 | 0 | 4 | |
| 6 | Algeria | 5 | 0 | 0 | 5 | 117 | 165 | −48 | 0 | |

Source: IHF.info
Rules for classification: 1) points; 2) head-to-head points; 3) head-to-head goal difference; 4) head-to-head number of goals scored; 5) Goal difference.
(H) Hosts
Notes:

| 7 August 2015; 19:00 | Russia | 45–34 | Algeria | Palace of Sporting Games, Yekaterinburg; Attendance: 2,000; Referees: Leszczynski, Piechota (POL) |
| 7 August 2015; 19:00 | Sharkov 10 | (22–19) | Abdi 7 | Palace of Sporting Games, Yekaterinburg; Attendance: 2,000; Referees: Leszczynski, Piechota (POL) |
| 7 August 2015; 19:00 | 3× (yellow card) 3× (suspension) | Report | 2× (yellow card) 3× (suspension) | Palace of Sporting Games, Yekaterinburg; Attendance: 2,000; Referees: Leszczynski, Piechota (POL) |

| 8 August 2015; 12:00 | Denmark | 25–17 | Qatar | Palace of Sporting Games, Yekaterinburg; Attendance: 100; Referees: Mitrović, Vešović (MNE) |
| 8 August 2015; 12:00 | Norager 6 | (12–8) | Helali 4 | Palace of Sporting Games, Yekaterinburg; Attendance: 100; Referees: Mitrović, Vešović (MNE) |
| 8 August 2015; 12:00 | 4× (yellow card) 3× (suspension) | Report | 3× (yellow card) 5× (suspension) | Palace of Sporting Games, Yekaterinburg; Attendance: 100; Referees: Mitrović, Vešović (MNE) |

| 8 August 2015; 14:00 | Switzerland | 30–29 | Croatia | Palace of Sporting Games, Yekaterinburg; Attendance: 100; Referees: Leszczynski, Piechota (POL) |
| 8 August 2015; 14:00 | Alili 8 | (13–13) | Babić, Medić 6 | Palace of Sporting Games, Yekaterinburg; Attendance: 100; Referees: Leszczynski, Piechota (POL) |
| 8 August 2015; 14:00 | 3× (yellow card) 5× (suspension) | Report | 3× (yellow card) 3× (suspension) | Palace of Sporting Games, Yekaterinburg; Attendance: 100; Referees: Leszczynski, Piechota (POL) |

| 9 August 2015; 16:00 | Qatar | 29–19 | Switzerland | Palace of Sporting Games, Yekaterinburg; Attendance: 100; Referees: Covaliuc, Covaliuc (MDA) |
| 9 August 2015; 16:00 | Abdelfattah, Guehis 6 | (14–5) | Alili 9 | Palace of Sporting Games, Yekaterinburg; Attendance: 100; Referees: Covaliuc, Covaliuc (MDA) |
| 9 August 2015; 16:00 | 3× (yellow card) 5× (suspension) | Report | 3× (yellow card) 4× (suspension) | Palace of Sporting Games, Yekaterinburg; Attendance: 100; Referees: Covaliuc, Covaliuc (MDA) |

| 9 August 2015; 18:00 | Croatia | 29–30 | Russia | Palace of Sporting Games, Yekaterinburg; Attendance: 2,000; Referees: Bethmann, Tzaferopoulos (GRE) |
| 9 August 2015; 18:00 | Medić 6 | (13–12) | Dashko 8 | Palace of Sporting Games, Yekaterinburg; Attendance: 2,000; Referees: Bethmann, Tzaferopoulos (GRE) |
| 9 August 2015; 18:00 | 4× (yellow card) 7× (suspension) | Report | 3× (yellow card) 5× (suspension) 2× (red card) | Palace of Sporting Games, Yekaterinburg; Attendance: 2,000; Referees: Bethmann, Tzaferopoulos (GRE) |

| 9 August 2015; 20:00 | Algeria | 19–33 | Denmark | Palace of Sporting Games, Yekaterinburg; Attendance: 100; Referees: Honda, Tabuchi (JPN) |
| 9 August 2015; 20:00 | Abdi 5 | (7–15) | Sass 6 | Palace of Sporting Games, Yekaterinburg; Attendance: 100; Referees: Honda, Tabuchi (JPN) |
| 9 August 2015; 20:00 | 3× (yellow card) 8× (suspension) | Report | 2× (yellow card) 4× (suspension) | Palace of Sporting Games, Yekaterinburg; Attendance: 100; Referees: Honda, Tabuchi (JPN) |

| 11 August 2015; 10:00 | Denmark | 37–27 | Croatia | Palace of Sporting Games, Yekaterinburg; Attendance: 50; Referees: Korja, Laitinen (FIN) |
| 11 August 2015; 10:00 | Møller 10 | (15–9) | Martinović 7 | Palace of Sporting Games, Yekaterinburg; Attendance: 50; Referees: Korja, Laitinen (FIN) |
| 11 August 2015; 10:00 | 3× (yellow card) 5× (suspension) | Report | 3× (yellow card) 7× (suspension) 1× (red card) | Palace of Sporting Games, Yekaterinburg; Attendance: 50; Referees: Korja, Laitinen (FIN) |

| 11 August 2015; 12:00 | Qatar | 25–21 | Algeria | Palace of Sporting Games, Yekaterinburg; Attendance: 100; Referees: Kulik, Nabokau (BLR) |
| 11 August 2015; 12:00 | Heiba 6 | (10–11) | Nidhal 6 | Palace of Sporting Games, Yekaterinburg; Attendance: 100; Referees: Kulik, Nabokau (BLR) |
| 11 August 2015; 12:00 | 3× (yellow card) 1× (suspension) | Report | 3× (yellow card) 5× (suspension) | Palace of Sporting Games, Yekaterinburg; Attendance: 100; Referees: Kulik, Nabokau (BLR) |

| 11 August 2015; 18:00 | Switzerland | 29–26 | Russia | Palace of Sporting Games, Yekaterinburg; Attendance: 2,000; Referees: Mitrović, Vešović (MNE) |
| 11 August 2015; 18:00 | Rubin 7 | (14–13) | Razmaev, Santalov 6 | Palace of Sporting Games, Yekaterinburg; Attendance: 2,000; Referees: Mitrović, Vešović (MNE) |
| 11 August 2015; 18:00 | 3× (yellow card) 2× (suspension) | Report | 3× (yellow card) 5× (suspension) | Palace of Sporting Games, Yekaterinburg; Attendance: 2,000; Referees: Mitrović, Vešović (MNE) |

| 12 August 2015; 16:00 | Switzerland | 30–21 | Algeria | Palace of Sporting Games, Yekaterinburg; Attendance: 100; Referees: Al-Watani, Qamber (BHR) |
| 12 August 2015; 16:00 | Alili 9 | (12–9) | Abdi 6 | Palace of Sporting Games, Yekaterinburg; Attendance: 100; Referees: Al-Watani, Qamber (BHR) |
| 12 August 2015; 16:00 | 4× (yellow card) 1× (suspension) | Report | 3× (yellow card) 8× (suspension) | Palace of Sporting Games, Yekaterinburg; Attendance: 100; Referees: Al-Watani, Qamber (BHR) |

| 12 August 2015; 18:00 | Russia | 29–29 | Denmark | Palace of Sporting Games, Yekaterinburg; Attendance: 2,000; Referees: Konjičanin, Konjičanin (BIH) |
| 12 August 2015; 18:00 | Dashko 9 | (14–14) | Møller 10 | Palace of Sporting Games, Yekaterinburg; Attendance: 2,000; Referees: Konjičanin, Konjičanin (BIH) |
| 12 August 2015; 18:00 | 3× (yellow card) 2× (suspension) | Report | 4× (yellow card) 2× (suspension) | Palace of Sporting Games, Yekaterinburg; Attendance: 2,000; Referees: Konjičanin, Konjičanin (BIH) |

| 12 August 2015; 20:00 | Croatia | 25–24 | Qatar | Palace of Sporting Games, Yekaterinburg; Attendance: 100; Referees: Leszczynski, Piechota (POL) |
| 12 August 2015; 20:00 | Babić 5 | (15–14) | Guehis 10 | Palace of Sporting Games, Yekaterinburg; Attendance: 100; Referees: Leszczynski, Piechota (POL) |
| 12 August 2015; 20:00 | 3× (yellow card) 4× (suspension) | Report | 3× (yellow card) 2× (suspension) | Palace of Sporting Games, Yekaterinburg; Attendance: 100; Referees: Leszczynski, Piechota (POL) |

| 14 August 2015; 10:00 | Algeria | 22–32 | Croatia | Palace of Sporting Games, Yekaterinburg; Attendance: 50; Referees: Honda, Tabuchi (JPN) |
| 14 August 2015; 10:00 | Nidhal 7 | (12–17) | Jelinić 9 | Palace of Sporting Games, Yekaterinburg; Attendance: 50; Referees: Honda, Tabuchi (JPN) |
| 14 August 2015; 10:00 | 2× (yellow card) 3× (suspension) | Report | 2× (yellow card) 6× (suspension) | Palace of Sporting Games, Yekaterinburg; Attendance: 50; Referees: Honda, Tabuchi (JPN) |

| 14 August 2015; 12:00 | Denmark | 34–23 | Switzerland | Palace of Sporting Games, Yekaterinburg; Attendance: 50; Referees: Kulik, Nabokau (BLR) |
| 14 August 2015; 12:00 | Møller 8 | (15–9) | Alili 6 | Palace of Sporting Games, Yekaterinburg; Attendance: 50; Referees: Kulik, Nabokau (BLR) |
| 14 August 2015; 12:00 | 3× (yellow card) 6× (suspension) | Report | 3× (yellow card) 7× (suspension) | Palace of Sporting Games, Yekaterinburg; Attendance: 50; Referees: Kulik, Nabokau (BLR) |

| 14 August 2015; 18:00 | Russia | 33–28 | Qatar | Palace of Sporting Games, Yekaterinburg; Attendance: 2,000; Referees: Bethmann, Tzaferopoulos (GRE) |
| 14 August 2015; 18:00 | Bolotin 8 | (18–15) | Abdelfattah 7 | Palace of Sporting Games, Yekaterinburg; Attendance: 2,000; Referees: Bethmann, Tzaferopoulos (GRE) |
| 14 August 2015; 18:00 | 3× (yellow card) 6× (suspension) | Report | 3× (yellow card) 3× (suspension) | Palace of Sporting Games, Yekaterinburg; Attendance: 2,000; Referees: Bethmann, Tzaferopoulos (GRE) |

=== Group D ===
| Pos | Team | Pld | W | D | L | GF | GA | GD | Pts | Qualification |
|---|---|---|---|---|---|---|---|---|---|---|
| 1 | Slovenia | 5 | 4 | 1 | 0 | 163 | 115 | +48 | 9 (Note: France–Slovenia 32–32) | Advanced to knockout stage |
| 2 | France | 5 | 4 | 1 | 0 | 157 | 115 | +42 | 9 | Advanced to knockout stage |
| 3 | Brazil | 5 | 3 | 0 | 2 | 131 | 120 | +11 | 6 | Advanced to knockout stage |
| 4 | Tunisia | 5 | 2 | 0 | 3 | 129 | 144 | −15 | 4 | Advanced to knockout stage |
| 5 | Japan | 5 | 1 | 0 | 4 | 114 | 144 | −30 | 2 | |
| 6 | Argentina | 5 | 0 | 0 | 5 | 98 | 154 | −56 | 0 | |

Source: IHF.info
Rules for classification: 1) points; 2) head-to-head points; 3) head-to-head goal difference; 4) head-to-head number of goals scored; 5) Goal difference.
Notes:

| 8 August 2015; 16:00 | France | 37–18 | Argentina | Palace of Sporting Games, Yekaterinburg; Attendance: 100; Referees: Kulik, Nabokau (BLR) |
| 8 August 2015; 16:00 | Mocquais, Kounkoud 7 | (15–7) | Bono 5 | Palace of Sporting Games, Yekaterinburg; Attendance: 100; Referees: Kulik, Nabokau (BLR) |
| 8 August 2015; 16:00 | 3× (yellow card) 2× (suspension) | Report | 3× (yellow card) 5× (suspension) | Palace of Sporting Games, Yekaterinburg; Attendance: 100; Referees: Kulik, Nabokau (BLR) |

| 8 August 2015; 18:00 | Slovenia | 31–18 | Tunisia | Palace of Sporting Games, Yekaterinburg; Attendance: 100; Referees: Al-Watani, Qamber (BHR) |
| 8 August 2015; 18:00 | Janc 6 | (14–9) | Memmich 5 | Palace of Sporting Games, Yekaterinburg; Attendance: 100; Referees: Al-Watani, Qamber (BHR) |
| 8 August 2015; 18:00 | 3× (yellow card) 5× (suspension) | Report | 2× (yellow card) 6× (suspension) | Palace of Sporting Games, Yekaterinburg; Attendance: 100; Referees: Al-Watani, Qamber (BHR) |

| 8 August 2015; 20:00 | Brazil | 28–23 | Japan | Palace of Sporting Games, Yekaterinburg; Attendance: 50; Referees: Covaliuc, Covaliuc (MDA) |
| 8 August 2015; 20:00 | Lemos 11 | (13–9) | Makino 6 | Palace of Sporting Games, Yekaterinburg; Attendance: 50; Referees: Covaliuc, Covaliuc (MDA) |
| 8 August 2015; 20:00 | 4× (yellow card) 5× (suspension) | Report | 3× (yellow card) 2× (suspension) | Palace of Sporting Games, Yekaterinburg; Attendance: 50; Referees: Covaliuc, Covaliuc (MDA) |

| 10 August 2015; 16:00 | Argentina | 15–29 | Slovenia | Palace of Sporting Games, Yekaterinburg; Attendance: 100; Referees: Bethmann, Tzaferopoulos (GRE) |
| 10 August 2015; 16:00 | Moyano 6 | (8–14) | Sokolič 7 | Palace of Sporting Games, Yekaterinburg; Attendance: 100; Referees: Bethmann, Tzaferopoulos (GRE) |
| 10 August 2015; 16:00 | 3× (yellow card) 5× (suspension) 1× (red card) | Report | 3× (yellow card) 3× (suspension) | Palace of Sporting Games, Yekaterinburg; Attendance: 100; Referees: Bethmann, Tzaferopoulos (GRE) |

| 10 August 2015; 18:00 | Japan | 18–27 | France | Palace of Sporting Games, Yekaterinburg; Attendance: 150; Referees: Korja, Laitinen (FIN) |
| 10 August 2015; 18:00 | Makino 6 | (12–15) | Fabregas, Richardson 5 | Palace of Sporting Games, Yekaterinburg; Attendance: 150; Referees: Korja, Laitinen (FIN) |
| 10 August 2015; 18:00 | 2× (yellow card) 4× (suspension) | Report | 3× (yellow card) 3× (suspension) | Palace of Sporting Games, Yekaterinburg; Attendance: 150; Referees: Korja, Laitinen (FIN) |

| 10 August 2015; 20:00 | Tunisia | 23–24 | Brazil | Palace of Sporting Games, Yekaterinburg; Attendance: 100; Referees: Leszczynski, Piechota (POL) |
| 10 August 2015; 20:00 | Ben Abdallah 6 | (9–10) | three players 5 | Palace of Sporting Games, Yekaterinburg; Attendance: 100; Referees: Leszczynski, Piechota (POL) |
| 10 August 2015; 20:00 | 5× (yellow card) 5× (suspension) 1× (red card) | Report | 3× (yellow card) 7× (suspension) 1× (red card) | Palace of Sporting Games, Yekaterinburg; Attendance: 100; Referees: Leszczynski, Piechota (POL) |

| 11 August 2015; 14:00 | Argentina | 23–24 | Japan | Palace of Sporting Games, Yekaterinburg; Attendance: 50; Referees: Konjičanin, Konjičanin (BIH) |
| 11 August 2015; 14:00 | Bono, Fischer 5 | (11–11) | Yamamoto, Yasuhira 4 | Palace of Sporting Games, Yekaterinburg; Attendance: 50; Referees: Konjičanin, Konjičanin (BIH) |
| 11 August 2015; 14:00 | 3× (yellow card) 3× (suspension) | Report | 3× (yellow card) 3× (suspension) 1× (red card) | Palace of Sporting Games, Yekaterinburg; Attendance: 50; Referees: Konjičanin, Konjičanin (BIH) |

| 11 August 2015; 16:00 | Slovenia | 34–27 | Brazil | Palace of Sporting Games, Yekaterinburg; Attendance: 100; Referees: Covaliuc, Covaliuc (MDA) |
| 11 August 2015; 16:00 | Janc 11 | (22–13) | Pacheco 7 | Palace of Sporting Games, Yekaterinburg; Attendance: 100; Referees: Covaliuc, Covaliuc (MDA) |
| 11 August 2015; 16:00 | 3× (yellow card) 4× (suspension) | Report | 3× (yellow card) 3× (suspension) | Palace of Sporting Games, Yekaterinburg; Attendance: 100; Referees: Covaliuc, Covaliuc (MDA) |

| 11 August 2015; 20:00 | France | 34–24 | Tunisia | Palace of Sporting Games, Yekaterinburg; Attendance: 100; Referees: Li, Liu (CHN) |
| 11 August 2015; 20:00 | Richardson 6 | (14–9) | Ben Abdallah 8 | Palace of Sporting Games, Yekaterinburg; Attendance: 100; Referees: Li, Liu (CHN) |
| 11 August 2015; 20:00 | 3× (yellow card) 8× (suspension) | Report | 3× (yellow card) 3× (suspension) | Palace of Sporting Games, Yekaterinburg; Attendance: 100; Referees: Li, Liu (CHN) |

| 13 August 2015; 16:00 | Slovenia | 37–23 | Japan | Palace of Sporting Games, Yekaterinburg; Attendance: 100; Referees: Diop, Faye (SEN) |
| 13 August 2015; 16:00 | Janc 8 | (19–13) | Ishado 8 | Palace of Sporting Games, Yekaterinburg; Attendance: 100; Referees: Diop, Faye (SEN) |
| 13 August 2015; 16:00 | 3× (yellow card) 3× (suspension) | Report | 2× (yellow card) | Palace of Sporting Games, Yekaterinburg; Attendance: 100; Referees: Diop, Faye (SEN) |

| 13 August 2015; 18:00 | Brazil | 23–27 | France | Palace of Sporting Games, Yekaterinburg; Attendance: 100; Referees: Bethmann, Tzaferopoulos (GRE) |
| 13 August 2015; 18:00 | Lemos 7 | (9–14) | Fabregas 5 | Palace of Sporting Games, Yekaterinburg; Attendance: 100; Referees: Bethmann, Tzaferopoulos (GRE) |
| 13 August 2015; 18:00 | 3× (yellow card) 5× (suspension) | Report | 4× (yellow card) 4× (suspension) | Palace of Sporting Games, Yekaterinburg; Attendance: 100; Referees: Bethmann, Tzaferopoulos (GRE) |

| 13 August 2015; 20:00 | Tunisia | 35–29 | Argentina | Palace of Sporting Games, Yekaterinburg; Attendance: 100; Referees: Li, Liu (CHN) |
| 13 August 2015; 20:00 | Ayari 8 | (18–12) | Moyano 7 | Palace of Sporting Games, Yekaterinburg; Attendance: 100; Referees: Li, Liu (CHN) |
| 13 August 2015; 20:00 | 3× (yellow card) 8× (suspension) | Report | 3× (yellow card) 4× (suspension) | Palace of Sporting Games, Yekaterinburg; Attendance: 100; Referees: Li, Liu (CHN) |

| 14 August 2015; 14:00 | France | 32–32 | Slovenia | Palace of Sporting Games, Yekaterinburg; Attendance: 100; Referees: Leszczynski, Piechota (POL) |
| 14 August 2015; 14:00 | Minne 8 | (16–17) | Janc 9 | Palace of Sporting Games, Yekaterinburg; Attendance: 100; Referees: Leszczynski, Piechota (POL) |
| 14 August 2015; 14:00 | 3× (yellow card) 3× (suspension) | Report | 3× (yellow card) 5× (suspension) 1× (red card) | Palace of Sporting Games, Yekaterinburg; Attendance: 100; Referees: Leszczynski, Piechota (POL) |

| 14 August 2015; 16:00 | Japan | 26–29 | Tunisia | Palace of Sporting Games, Yekaterinburg; Attendance: 100; Referees: Bartlett, Stokes (GBR) |
| 14 August 2015; 16:00 | Yasuhira 8 | (12–14) | Ghachem 9 | Palace of Sporting Games, Yekaterinburg; Attendance: 100; Referees: Bartlett, Stokes (GBR) |
| 14 August 2015; 16:00 | 2× (yellow card) 2× (suspension) | Report | 3× (yellow card) 5× (suspension) | Palace of Sporting Games, Yekaterinburg; Attendance: 100; Referees: Bartlett, Stokes (GBR) |

| 14 August 2015; 20:00 | Brazil | 29–13 | Argentina | Palace of Sporting Games, Yekaterinburg; Attendance: 100; Referees: Konjičanin, Konjičanin (BIH) |
| 14 August 2015; 20:00 | Dutra, Silveira 6 | (9–8) | Werner 5 | Palace of Sporting Games, Yekaterinburg; Attendance: 100; Referees: Konjičanin, Konjičanin (BIH) |
| 14 August 2015; 20:00 | 3× (yellow card) 4× (suspension) | Report | 3× (yellow card) 4× (suspension) | Palace of Sporting Games, Yekaterinburg; Attendance: 100; Referees: Konjičanin, Konjičanin (BIH) |

== Knockout stage ==
Round of 16
Iceland | 34
South Korea | 28
Brazil | 28
Russia | 26
Norway | 39
Hungary | 33
Slovenia | 26
Croatia | 23
Sweden | 31
Egypt | 26
Switzerland | 24
France | 29
Serbia | 19
Spain | 25
Denmark | 28
Tunisia | 14

Quarterfinals
Iceland | 32
Brazil | 27
Norway | 29
Slovenia | 34
Sweden | 28
France | 35
Spain | 23
Denmark | 18

Semifinals
Iceland | 30
Slovenia | 31
France | 34
Spain | 27

Final
Slovenia | 26
France | 33
Third place
Iceland | 26
Spain | 22

5th place bracket

5th–8th place Semifinals
19 August
Brazil | 31
Norway (pen.) | 32
19 August
Sweden | 27
Denmark | 25

Fifth place
20 August
Norway | 27
Sweden | 32
Seventh place
20 August
Brazil | 23
Denmark | 26

=== Round of 16 ===
| 16 August 2015; 13:30 | Iceland | 34–28 | South Korea | Palace of Sporting Games, Yekaterinburg; Attendance: 100; Referees: Kulik, Nabokau (BLR) |
| 16 August 2015; 13:30 | Magnússon 10 | (17–14) | Kang Seok-ju 7 | Palace of Sporting Games, Yekaterinburg; Attendance: 100; Referees: Kulik, Nabokau (BLR) |
| 16 August 2015; 13:30 | 3× (yellow card) 2× (suspension) | Report | 3× (yellow card) 3× (suspension) | Palace of Sporting Games, Yekaterinburg; Attendance: 100; Referees: Kulik, Nabokau (BLR) |

| 16 August 2015; 13:30 | Switzerland | 24–29 | France | KRK Uralets, Yekaterinburg; Attendance: 150; Referees: Grillo, Lenci (ARG) |
| 16 August 2015; 13:30 | Tynowski 5 | (10–18) | Richardson 6 | KRK Uralets, Yekaterinburg; Attendance: 150; Referees: Grillo, Lenci (ARG) |
| 16 August 2015; 13:30 | 2× (yellow card) 3× (suspension) | Report | 3× (yellow card) 3× (suspension) | KRK Uralets, Yekaterinburg; Attendance: 150; Referees: Grillo, Lenci (ARG) |

| 16 August 2015; 16:00 | Norway | 39–33 | Hungary | Palace of Sporting Games, Yekaterinburg; Attendance: 300; Referees: Brunner, Salah (SUI) |
| 16 August 2015; 16:00 | Gulliksen 9 | (23–19) | Bartók 8 | Palace of Sporting Games, Yekaterinburg; Attendance: 300; Referees: Brunner, Salah (SUI) |
| 16 August 2015; 16:00 | 3× (yellow card) 5× (suspension) | Report | 4× (yellow card) 3× (suspension) | Palace of Sporting Games, Yekaterinburg; Attendance: 300; Referees: Brunner, Salah (SUI) |

| 16 August 2015; 16:00 | Sweden | 31–26 | Egypt | KRK Uralets, Yekaterinburg; Attendance: 100; Referees: Mitrović, Vešović (MNE) |
| 16 August 2015; 16:00 | Claar 9 | (13–10) | Hassan 8 | KRK Uralets, Yekaterinburg; Attendance: 100; Referees: Mitrović, Vešović (MNE) |
| 16 August 2015; 16:00 | 3× (yellow card) 3× (suspension) | Report | 3× (yellow card) 4× (suspension) | KRK Uralets, Yekaterinburg; Attendance: 100; Referees: Mitrović, Vešović (MNE) |

| 16 August 2015; 18:30 | Brazil | 28–26 | Russia | Palace of Sporting Games, Yekaterinburg; Attendance: 2,000; Referees: Al-Watani, Qamber (BHR) |
| 16 August 2015; 18:30 | Dutra 7 | (12–10) | Santalov 8 | Palace of Sporting Games, Yekaterinburg; Attendance: 2,000; Referees: Al-Watani, Qamber (BHR) |
| 16 August 2015; 18:30 | 3× (yellow card) 2× (suspension) | Report | 3× (yellow card) 2× (suspension) | Palace of Sporting Games, Yekaterinburg; Attendance: 2,000; Referees: Al-Watani, Qamber (BHR) |

| 16 August 2015; 18:30 | Serbia | 19–25 | Spain | KRK Uralets, Yekaterinburg; Attendance: 100; Referees: Bethmann, Tzaferopoulos (GRE) |
| 16 August 2015; 18:30 | Rakocija 7 | (8–9) | D. Dujshebaev, Fernández 5 | KRK Uralets, Yekaterinburg; Attendance: 100; Referees: Bethmann, Tzaferopoulos (GRE) |
| 16 August 2015; 18:30 | 4× (yellow card) 4× (suspension) | Report | 3× (yellow card) 3× (suspension) | KRK Uralets, Yekaterinburg; Attendance: 100; Referees: Bethmann, Tzaferopoulos (GRE) |

| 16 August 2015; 21:00 | Slovenia | 26–23 | Croatia | Palace of Sporting Games, Yekaterinburg; Attendance: 100; Referees: Kiselev, Kiyashko (RUS) |
| 16 August 2015; 21:00 | Janc 9 | (13–9) | Jurakić, Mandić 4 | Palace of Sporting Games, Yekaterinburg; Attendance: 100; Referees: Kiselev, Kiyashko (RUS) |
| 16 August 2015; 21:00 | 3× (yellow card) 5× (suspension) | Report | 3× (yellow card) 2× (suspension) | Palace of Sporting Games, Yekaterinburg; Attendance: 100; Referees: Kiselev, Kiyashko (RUS) |

| 16 August 2015; 21:00 | Denmark | 28–14 | Tunisia | KRK Uralets, Yekaterinburg; Attendance: 50; Referees: Honda, Tabuchi (JPN) |
| 16 August 2015; 21:00 | Holm, Norager 4 | (15–8) | Ghachem 3 | KRK Uralets, Yekaterinburg; Attendance: 50; Referees: Honda, Tabuchi (JPN) |
| 16 August 2015; 21:00 | 3× (yellow card) 4× (suspension) | Report | 3× (yellow card) 4× (suspension) | KRK Uralets, Yekaterinburg; Attendance: 50; Referees: Honda, Tabuchi (JPN) |

=== Quarterfinals ===
| 17 August 2015; 15:45 | Iceland | 32–27 | Brazil | Palace of Sporting Games, Yekaterinburg; Attendance: 100; Referees: Konjičanin, Konjičanin (BIH) |
| 17 August 2015; 15:45 | E. Magnusson, Ríkharðsson 7 | (15–10) | Dutra 8 | Palace of Sporting Games, Yekaterinburg; Attendance: 100; Referees: Konjičanin, Konjičanin (BIH) |
| 17 August 2015; 15:45 | 2× (yellow card) 2× (suspension) | Report | 3× (yellow card) 3× (suspension) | Palace of Sporting Games, Yekaterinburg; Attendance: 100; Referees: Konjičanin, Konjičanin (BIH) |

| 17 August 2015; 18:00 | France | 35–28 | Sweden | KRK Uralets, Yekaterinburg; Attendance: 200; Referees: Kulik, Nabokau (BLR) |
| 17 August 2015; 18:00 | Minne 12 | (20–16) | Claar, Sandell 5 | KRK Uralets, Yekaterinburg; Attendance: 200; Referees: Kulik, Nabokau (BLR) |
| 17 August 2015; 18:00 | 4× (yellow card) 1× (suspension) | Report | | KRK Uralets, Yekaterinburg; Attendance: 200; Referees: Kulik, Nabokau (BLR) |

| 17 August 2015; 20:30 | Norway | 29–34 | Slovenia | Palace of Sporting Games, Yekaterinburg; Attendance: 150; Referees: Covaliuc, Covaliuc (MDA) |
| 17 August 2015; 20:30 | Kopp, Schoenningsen 8 | (13–16) | Janc, Malus 9 | Palace of Sporting Games, Yekaterinburg; Attendance: 150; Referees: Covaliuc, Covaliuc (MDA) |
| 17 August 2015; 20:30 | 4× (yellow card) 2× (suspension) | Report | 3× (yellow card) 4× (suspension) 1× (red card) | Palace of Sporting Games, Yekaterinburg; Attendance: 150; Referees: Covaliuc, Covaliuc (MDA) |

| 17 August 2015; 20:30 | Spain | 23–18 | Denmark | KRK Uralets, Yekaterinburg; Attendance: 200; Referees: Brunner, Salah (SUI) |
| 17 August 2015; 20:30 | D. Dujshebaev 8 | (13–8) | Bitsch 5 | KRK Uralets, Yekaterinburg; Attendance: 200; Referees: Brunner, Salah (SUI) |
| 17 August 2015; 20:30 | 3× (yellow card) 3× (suspension) | Report | 3× (yellow card) 5× (suspension) | KRK Uralets, Yekaterinburg; Attendance: 200; Referees: Brunner, Salah (SUI) |

=== 5th–8th place semifinals ===
19 August 2015
11:00
Brazil
31–32
Norway
Palace of Sporting Games, Yekaterinburg
Attendance: 100
Referees: Leszczynski, Piechota (POL)
Pacheco 7
(16–15)
Gulliksen 10
3× (yellow card) 3× (suspension)
Report
3× (yellow card) 2× (suspension)

FT: 29–29 Pen: 2–3

| 19 August 2015; 13:15 | Sweden | 27–25 | Denmark | Palace of Sporting Games, Yekaterinburg; Attendance: 100; Referees: Konjičanin, Konjičanin (BIH) |
| 19 August 2015; 13:15 | Hallbäck 10 | (12–12) | Bitsch 6 | Palace of Sporting Games, Yekaterinburg; Attendance: 100; Referees: Konjičanin, Konjičanin (BIH) |
| 19 August 2015; 13:15 | 4× (yellow card) 4× (suspension) | Report | 3× (yellow card) 3× (suspension) | Palace of Sporting Games, Yekaterinburg; Attendance: 100; Referees: Konjičanin, Konjičanin (BIH) |

=== Semifinals ===
| 19 August 2015; 15:30 | Iceland | 30–31 | Slovenia | Palace of Sporting Games, Yekaterinburg; Attendance: 200; Referees: Grillo, Lenci (ARG) |
| 19 August 2015; 15:30 | Styrmission 7 | (15–11) | Janc 11 | Palace of Sporting Games, Yekaterinburg; Attendance: 200; Referees: Grillo, Lenci (ARG) |
| 19 August 2015; 15:30 | 3× (yellow card) 1× (suspension) | Report | 2× (yellow card) 3× (suspension) | Palace of Sporting Games, Yekaterinburg; Attendance: 200; Referees: Grillo, Lenci (ARG) |

| 19 August 2015; 18:00 | France | 34–27 | Spain | Palace of Sporting Games, Yekaterinburg; Attendance: 700; Referees: Bethmann, Tzaferopoulos (GRE) |
| 19 August 2015; 18:00 | Minne 9 | (18–13) | Torriko 7 | Palace of Sporting Games, Yekaterinburg; Attendance: 700; Referees: Bethmann, Tzaferopoulos (GRE) |
| 19 August 2015; 18:00 | 3× (yellow card) 2× (suspension) | Report | 3× (yellow card) 4× (suspension) 1× (red card) | Palace of Sporting Games, Yekaterinburg; Attendance: 700; Referees: Bethmann, Tzaferopoulos (GRE) |

=== Seventh place game ===
| 20 August 2015; 11:00 | Brazil | 23–26 | Denmark | Palace of Sporting Games, Yekaterinburg; Attendance: 50; Referees: Al-Watani, Qamber (BHR) |
| 20 August 2015; 11:00 | Dutra 10 | (14–16) | Krabbe 6 | Palace of Sporting Games, Yekaterinburg; Attendance: 50; Referees: Al-Watani, Qamber (BHR) |
| 20 August 2015; 11:00 | 3× (yellow card) 2× (suspension) | Report | 3× (yellow card) 3× (suspension) | Palace of Sporting Games, Yekaterinburg; Attendance: 50; Referees: Al-Watani, Qamber (BHR) |

=== Fifth place game ===
| 20 August 2015; 13:15 | Norway | 27–32 | Sweden | Palace of Sporting Games, Yekaterinburg; Attendance: 50; Referees: Mitrović, Vešović (MNE) |
| 20 August 2015; 13:15 | Schoenningsen 8 | (10–14) | Cosmo, Hansson 5 | Palace of Sporting Games, Yekaterinburg; Attendance: 50; Referees: Mitrović, Vešović (MNE) |
| 20 August 2015; 13:15 | 3× (yellow card) 3× (suspension) | Report | 3× (yellow card) 2× (suspension) | Palace of Sporting Games, Yekaterinburg; Attendance: 50; Referees: Mitrović, Vešović (MNE) |

=== Third place game ===
| 20 August 2015; 15:30 | Iceland | 26–22 | Spain | Palace of Sporting Games, Yekaterinburg; Attendance: 300; Referees: Kiselev, Kiyashko (RUS) |
| 20 August 2015; 15:30 | Ó. Magnússon 8 | (12–9) | Fernández 10 | Palace of Sporting Games, Yekaterinburg; Attendance: 300; Referees: Kiselev, Kiyashko (RUS) |
| 20 August 2015; 15:30 | 3× (yellow card) 3× (suspension) | Report | 3× (yellow card) 1× (suspension) | Palace of Sporting Games, Yekaterinburg; Attendance: 300; Referees: Kiselev, Kiyashko (RUS) |

=== Final ===
| 20 August 2015; 18:00 | Slovenia | 26–33 | France | Palace of Sporting Games, Yekaterinburg; Attendance: 2,000; Referees: Brunner, Salah (SUI) |
| 20 August 2015; 18:00 | Janc, Malus 5 | (13–16) | Mem 6 | Palace of Sporting Games, Yekaterinburg; Attendance: 2,000; Referees: Brunner, Salah (SUI) |
| 20 August 2015; 18:00 | 3× (yellow card) 2× (suspension) | Report | 3× (yellow card) 4× (suspension) | Palace of Sporting Games, Yekaterinburg; Attendance: 2,000; Referees: Brunner, Salah (SUI) |

== 9–16th placement games ==
The eight losers of the round of 16 were seeded according to their results in the preliminary round against teams ranked 1–4 and played an elimination game to determine their final position.

=== Ranking ===
| Pos | Team | Pld | W | D | L | GF | GA | GD | Pts |
|---|---|---|---|---|---|---|---|---|---|
| 1 | Switzerland | 3 | 2 | 0 | 1 | 82 | 89 | −7 | 4 |
| 2 | Hungary | 3 | 1 | 1 | 1 | 99 | 90 | +9 | 3 |
| 3 | Russia | 3 | 1 | 1 | 1 | 85 | 87 | −2 | 3 |
| 4 | Serbia | 3 | 1 | 0 | 2 | 82 | 103 | −21 | 2 |
| 5 | South Korea | 3 | 0 | 1 | 2 | 83 | 97 | −14 | 1 |
| 6 | Croatia | 3 | 0 | 0 | 3 | 85 | 97 | −12 | 0 |
| 7 | Egypt | 3 | 0 | 0 | 3 | 73 | 85 | −12 | 0 |
| 8 | Tunisia | 3 | 0 | 0 | 3 | 65 | 89 | −24 | 0 |

Source: IHF.info
Rules for classification: 1) points; 2) head-to-head points; 3) head-to-head goal difference; 4) head-to-head number of goals scored; 5) Goal difference.

=== 15th place game ===
| 17 August 2015; 13:30 | Egypt | 31–27 | Tunisia | KRK Uralets, Yekaterinburg; Attendance: 50; Referees: Kiselev, Kiyashko (RUS) |
| 17 August 2015; 13:30 | Omar 11 | (17–12) | Ghachem 8 | KRK Uralets, Yekaterinburg; Attendance: 50; Referees: Kiselev, Kiyashko (RUS) |
| 17 August 2015; 13:30 | 3× (yellow card) 4× (suspension) | Report | 2× (yellow card) 4× (suspension) | KRK Uralets, Yekaterinburg; Attendance: 50; Referees: Kiselev, Kiyashko (RUS) |

=== 13th place game ===
| 17 August 2015; 15:45 | South Korea | 36–30 | Croatia | KRK Uralets, Yekaterinburg; Attendance: 50; Referees: Li, Liu (CHN) |
| 17 August 2015; 15:45 | Seo Hyeon-ho 6 | (19–20) | Jurakić 6 | KRK Uralets, Yekaterinburg; Attendance: 50; Referees: Li, Liu (CHN) |
| 17 August 2015; 15:45 | 4× (yellow card) 2× (suspension) | Report | 4× (yellow card) 4× (suspension) | KRK Uralets, Yekaterinburg; Attendance: 50; Referees: Li, Liu (CHN) |

=== Eleventh place game ===
| 17 August 2015; 18:00 | Russia | 37–28 | Serbia | Palace of Sporting Games, Yekaterinburg; Attendance: 800; Referees: Leszczynski, Piechota (POL) |
| 17 August 2015; 18:00 | Sharkov 6 | (19–17) | Kurtes 6 | Palace of Sporting Games, Yekaterinburg; Attendance: 800; Referees: Leszczynski, Piechota (POL) |
| 17 August 2015; 18:00 | 3× (yellow card) 1× (suspension) | Report | 3× (yellow card) 4× (suspension) 1× (red card) | Palace of Sporting Games, Yekaterinburg; Attendance: 800; Referees: Leszczynski, Piechota (POL) |

=== Ninth place game ===
| 17 August 2015; 13:30 | Switzerland | 35–33 | Hungary | Palace of Sporting Games, Yekaterinburg; Attendance: 50; Referees: Bartlett, Stokes (GBR) |
| 17 August 2015; 13:30 | Alili, Schild 11 | (15–15) | Győri 9 | Palace of Sporting Games, Yekaterinburg; Attendance: 50; Referees: Bartlett, Stokes (GBR) |
| 17 August 2015; 13:30 | 3× (yellow card) 1× (suspension) | Report | 3× (yellow card) 5× (suspension) | Palace of Sporting Games, Yekaterinburg; Attendance: 50; Referees: Bartlett, Stokes (GBR) |

== President's Cup ==
17th place bracket

17th–20th place Semifinals
16 August
Poland | 19
Germany | 45
16 August
Qatar | 27
Japan | 23

17th place
17 August
Germany | 29
Qatar | 27
19th place
17 August
Poland | 29
Japan | 24

21st place bracket

21st–24th place Semifinals
16 August
Chile | 27
Venezuela | 32
16 August
Algeria | 28
Argentina | 29 P

21st place
17 August
Venezuela | 18
Argentina | 29
23rd place
17 August
Chile | 24
Algeria | 33

=== 21st–24th place semifinals ===
| 16 August 2015; 09:00 | Chile | 27–32 | Venezuela | Palace of Sporting Games, Yekaterinburg; Attendance: 60; Referees: Li, Liu (CHN) |
| 16 August 2015; 09:00 | Paulsen 9 | (12–16) | Moreno 10 | Palace of Sporting Games, Yekaterinburg; Attendance: 60; Referees: Li, Liu (CHN) |
| 16 August 2015; 09:00 | 4× (yellow card) 1× (suspension) 1× (red card) | Report | 2× (yellow card) 4× (suspension) | Palace of Sporting Games, Yekaterinburg; Attendance: 60; Referees: Li, Liu (CHN) |

16 August 2015
09:00
Algeria
28–29
Argentina
KRK Uralets, Yekaterinburg
Attendance: 50
Referees: Diop, Faye (SEN)
Abdi 9
(13–11)
Moyano 8
3× (yellow card) 4× (suspension)
Report
3× (yellow card) 2× (suspension)

FT: 24–24 Pen: 4–5

=== 17th–20th place semifinals ===
| 16 August 2015; 11:15 | Poland | 19–45 | Germany | Palace of Sporting Games, Yekaterinburg; Attendance: 60; Referees: Bartlett, Stokes (GBR) |
| 16 August 2015; 11:15 | Netz 6 | (7–19) | Beyer 7 | Palace of Sporting Games, Yekaterinburg; Attendance: 60; Referees: Bartlett, Stokes (GBR) |
| 16 August 2015; 11:15 | 3× (yellow card) 3× (suspension) | Report | 1× (yellow card) 3× (suspension) | Palace of Sporting Games, Yekaterinburg; Attendance: 60; Referees: Bartlett, Stokes (GBR) |

| 16 August 2015; 11:15 | Qatar | 27–23 | Japan | KRK Uralets, Yekaterinburg; Attendance: 50; Referees: Covaliuc, Covaliuc (MDA) |
| 16 August 2015; 11:15 | Gačević 5 | (14–9) | Tasato 5 | KRK Uralets, Yekaterinburg; Attendance: 50; Referees: Covaliuc, Covaliuc (MDA) |
| 16 August 2015; 11:15 | 2× (yellow card) 1× (suspension) | Report | 3× (yellow card) | KRK Uralets, Yekaterinburg; Attendance: 50; Referees: Covaliuc, Covaliuc (MDA) |

=== 23rd place game ===
| 17 August 2015; 09:00 | Chile | 24–33 | Algeria | Palace of Sporting Games, Yekaterinburg; Attendance: 50; Referees: Hussein, Imran (IRQ) |
| 17 August 2015; 09:00 | Paulsen 6 | (8–18) | Nidhal 8 | Palace of Sporting Games, Yekaterinburg; Attendance: 50; Referees: Hussein, Imran (IRQ) |
| 17 August 2015; 09:00 | 2× (yellow card) 1× (suspension) | Report | 2× (yellow card) 3× (suspension) | Palace of Sporting Games, Yekaterinburg; Attendance: 50; Referees: Hussein, Imran (IRQ) |

=== 21st place game ===
| 17 August 2015; 09:00 | Venezuela | 18–29 | Argentina | KRK Uralets, Yekaterinburg; Attendance: 50; Referees: Korja, Laitinen (FIN) |
| 17 August 2015; 09:00 | Gotia 5 | (9–14) | Moyano 9 | KRK Uralets, Yekaterinburg; Attendance: 50; Referees: Korja, Laitinen (FIN) |
| 17 August 2015; 09:00 | 2× (yellow card) 2× (suspension) 1× (red card) | Report | 2× (yellow card) 1× (suspension) | KRK Uralets, Yekaterinburg; Attendance: 50; Referees: Korja, Laitinen (FIN) |

=== 19th place game ===
| 17 August 2015; 11:15 | Poland | 29–24 | Japan | KRK Uralets, Yekaterinburg; Attendance: 50; Referees: Diop, Faye (SEN) |
| 17 August 2015; 11:15 | Moryto 9 | (15–13) | Ishado 6 | KRK Uralets, Yekaterinburg; Attendance: 50; Referees: Diop, Faye (SEN) |
| 17 August 2015; 11:15 | 3× (yellow card) 3× (suspension) | Report | 2× (yellow card) | KRK Uralets, Yekaterinburg; Attendance: 50; Referees: Diop, Faye (SEN) |

=== 17th place game ===
| 17 August 2015; 11:15 | Germany | 29–27 | Qatar | Palace of Sporting Games, Yekaterinburg; Attendance: 50; Referees: Mitrović, Vešović (MNE) |
| 17 August 2015; 11:15 | Mertens 7 | (18–11) | Heiba, Helali 6 | Palace of Sporting Games, Yekaterinburg; Attendance: 50; Referees: Mitrović, Vešović (MNE) |
| 17 August 2015; 11:15 | 3× (yellow card) 2× (suspension) | Report | 3× (yellow card) 1× (suspension) | Palace of Sporting Games, Yekaterinburg; Attendance: 50; Referees: Mitrović, Vešović (MNE) |

== Final standings ==
| Rank | Team |
|---|---|
| Gold medal | France |
| Silver medal | Slovenia |
| Bronze medal | Iceland |
| 4 | Spain |
| 5 | Sweden |
| 6 | Norway |
| 7 | Denmark |
| 8 | Brazil |
| 9 | Switzerland |
| 10 | Hungary |
| 11 | Russia |
| 12 | Serbia |
| 13 | South Korea |
| 14 | Croatia |
| 15 | Egypt |
| 16 | Tunisia |
| 17 | Germany |
| 18 | Qatar |
| 19 | Poland |
| 20 | Japan |
| 21 | Argentina |
| 22 | Venezuela |
| 23 | Algeria |
| 24 | Chile |

== Awards ==
=== Top scorers ===
Slovenian right back Blaž Janc is topscorer with 69 goals.

=== All-star team ===
All-star team is:

- MVP Melvyn Richardson (FRA)
- Goalkeeper: Xoan Ledo (ESP)
- Right wing: Óðinn Ríkharðsson (ISL)
- Right back: Blaž Janc (SVN)
- Centre back: Melvyn Richardson (FRA)
- Left back: Daniel Dujshebaev (ESP)
- Left wing: Tilen Sokolič (SVN)
- Pivot: Ludovic Fabregas (FRA)
