= Palace of Sporting Games =

Sports arena in Yekaterinburg, Russia

Palace of Sporting Games "Uralochka" (DIVS)
- Uralochka, DIVS
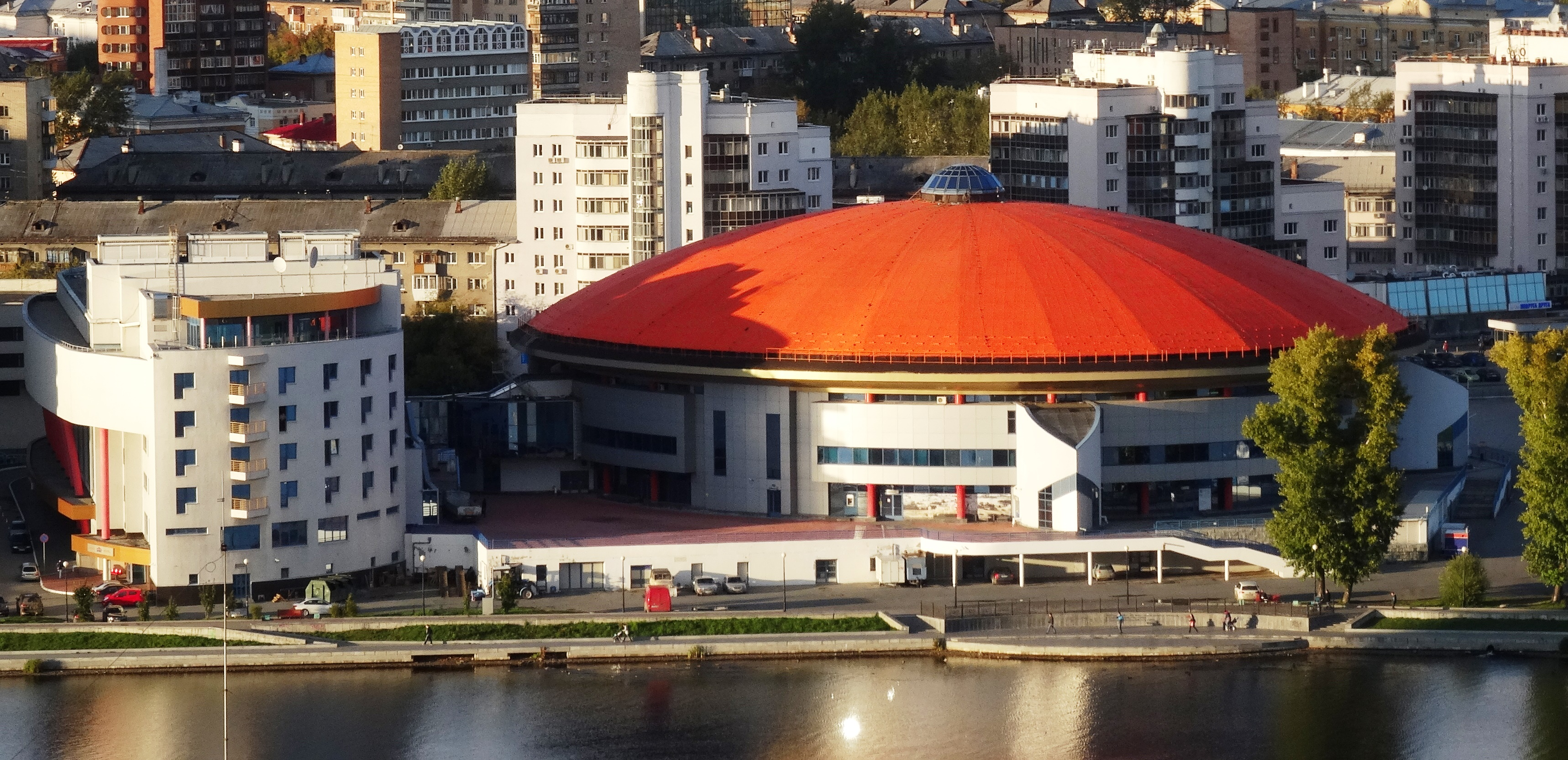
- Location: Yekaterinburg, Russia
- Coordinates: 56°50′49″N 60°35′52″E
- Owner: Sverdlovsk Oblast
- Capacity: 4,281 seats

Construction
- Built: 5 June 2001
- Opened: 11 June 2003
- Construction cost: 14.5 million euros (arena)
- Architect: Mikhail Motin, Evgeniy Kuranov, Stjepan Stipaničić

The Palace of Sporting Games "Uralochka" (DIVS) (Russian: Дворец игровых видов спорта «Уралочка» (ДИВС)) is a multi-purpose arena on the shore of the Iset River in the city center of Yekaterinburg. It has a capacity of 4,281 spectators and is the second largest sports arena in the city, with KRK Uralets being the largest. Volleyball and basketball clubs of men and women, as well as a futsal team play their home games at the arena. Occasionally, competitions in individual sports, rhythmic gymnastics, artistic gymnastics, or tennis take place. Concerts take place in the arena equally often.

== History ==
For a long time, only one large sports arena existed in Yekaterinburg—the KRK Uraletz (then known as the Sport Palace of Trade Unions), built in 1972. It became overwhelmed with the city's numerous sport events and furthermore required a renovation. For this reason, governor Eduard Rossel of Sverdlovsk Oblast decided in March 2000 to build a new sports arena. Construction officially began on 5 June 2001. The Austrian E. Fuhrmann Baugesellschaft was commissioned for the construction work, which was financed in full by private investors. The metallurgy firm UGMK paid for a large portion of the construction costs. The foreseen cost of 17 million euros from 2002 would have been allowed to increase considerably, but the cost for the arena alone (block A) was estimated at 14.5 million euros. Today the arena is within the possession of the arena organization, of which Sverdlovsk Oblast is the owner.

On 11 June 2003, the Palace was officially opened. On this day the opening match of the Yeltsin Cup volleyball tournament took place as the first game, at which the first Russian president Boris Jelzin and Viacheslav Fetisov, then the chairmen of the city's sport committee and later the sport minister, were present.

From the beginning, the planning committee had envisioned a management and training complex (block B) in the direct vicinity of the sports arena (block A). This building is directly connected to the arena by an elevated corridor on the second floor. It holds the arena management, the athlete housing "DIVS" with 32 rooms, the health, meeting, and training rooms (with three volleyball fields underneath), a room for press conferences, as well as a bistro. The multi-purpose building began operation in Juli 2006.

In winter of 2014, the roof of the arena was renovated from the outside and covered with orange awnings to match the colors of the women's basketball team UMMC Ekaterinburg.

== Technical data ==
The sports arena (block A) is 29.1 meters tall, has an elliptical base with a width of 68 meters and a length of 84 meters, and has a combined area of approximately 20,800 square meters. 1720 square meters are dedicated to sports activities and 1004 square meters to the playing field itself. The ceiling height is 21 meters.

The stands for spectators are designed for 4,281 seats, 1,108 of which are seats in retractable stands.

== Location ==
The sports arena is located in the eastern part of the Zheleznodorozhny district at the address ul. Eremina 10 (ул. Ереминa 10) in the city center. It lies on the shore of the historic lake out of which the Iset River flows. A path directly connects the arena to the shorefront. The constructivist Dinamo Sport Complex lies next to the Palace.

The Palace of Sporting Games has good connection to the public transportation of Yekaterinburg. Dinamo is located directly outside of the entrance to the arena. A trolley stop on trolley line 4 lies only 300 meters away, and the next station of the Upravleniye Dorogi streetcar is 600 meters away.

== Management ==
From 2003 to 2019 the institution was headed by Gennady Sevastyanov.

From 2019 to 2022 the institution is headed by Nikolai Garbuzov.

Since 2022 the CEO is Sergey Konstantinov.

== Photos ==
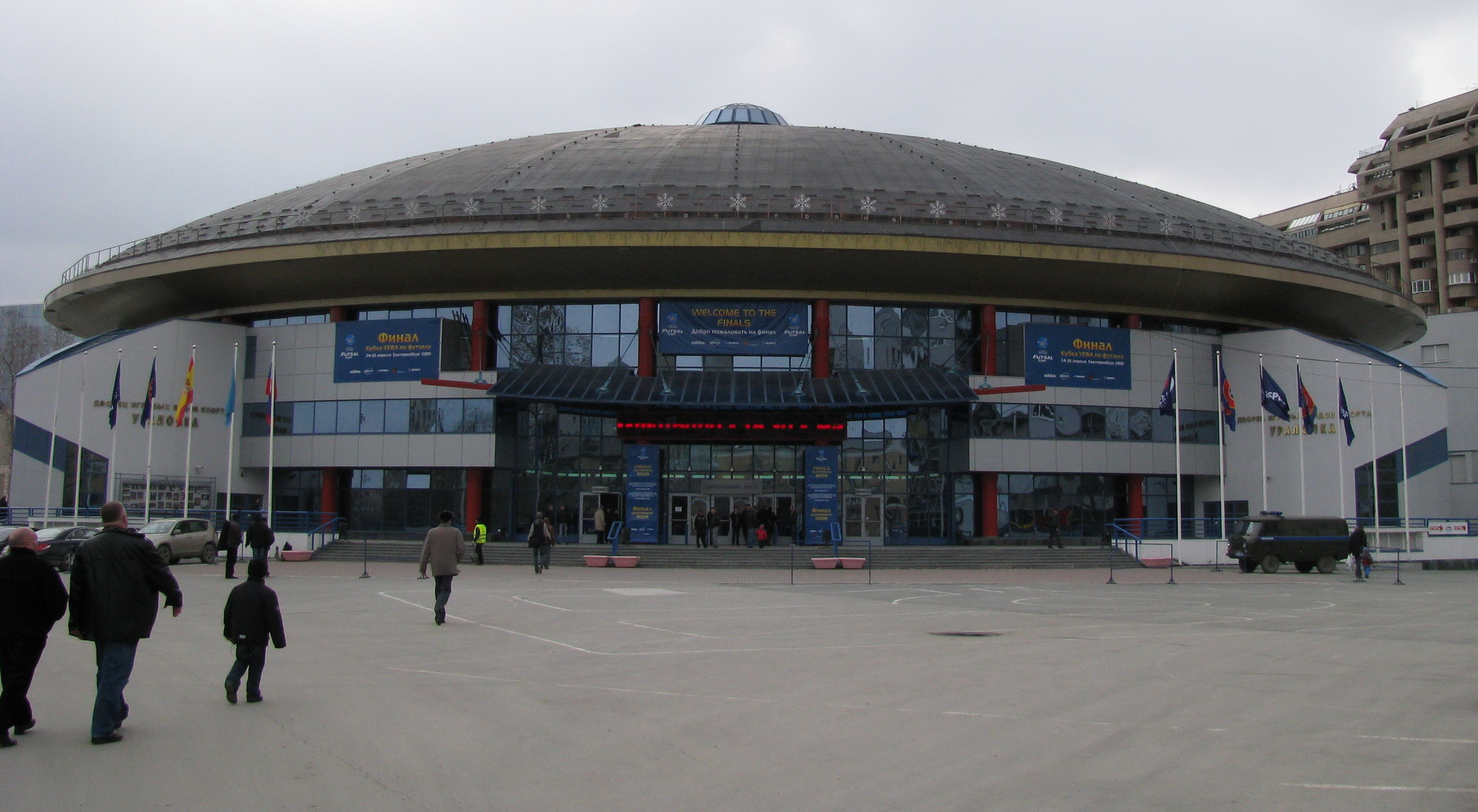
DIVS during the 2009 UEFA Futsal Cup

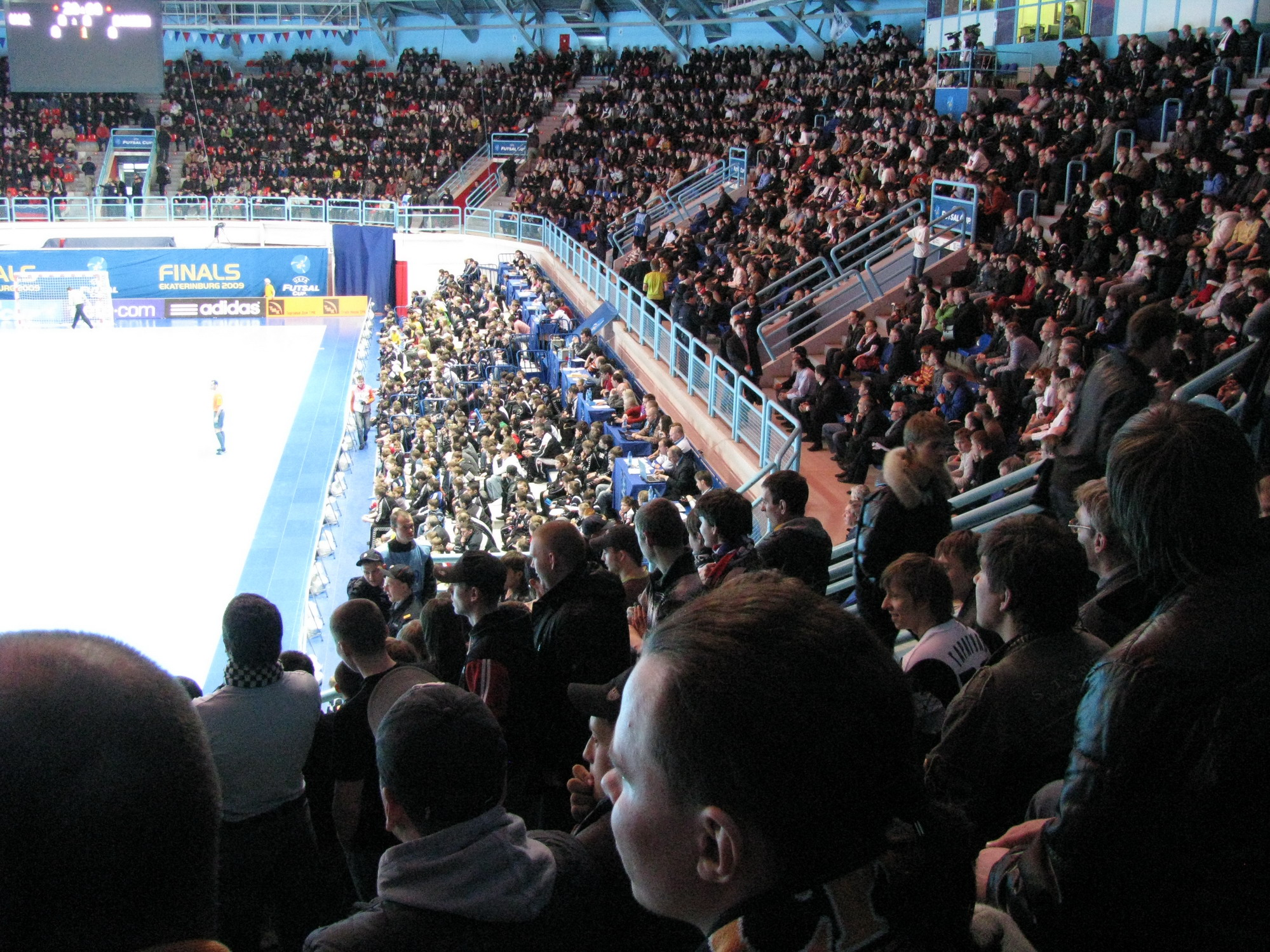
View from inside: stands

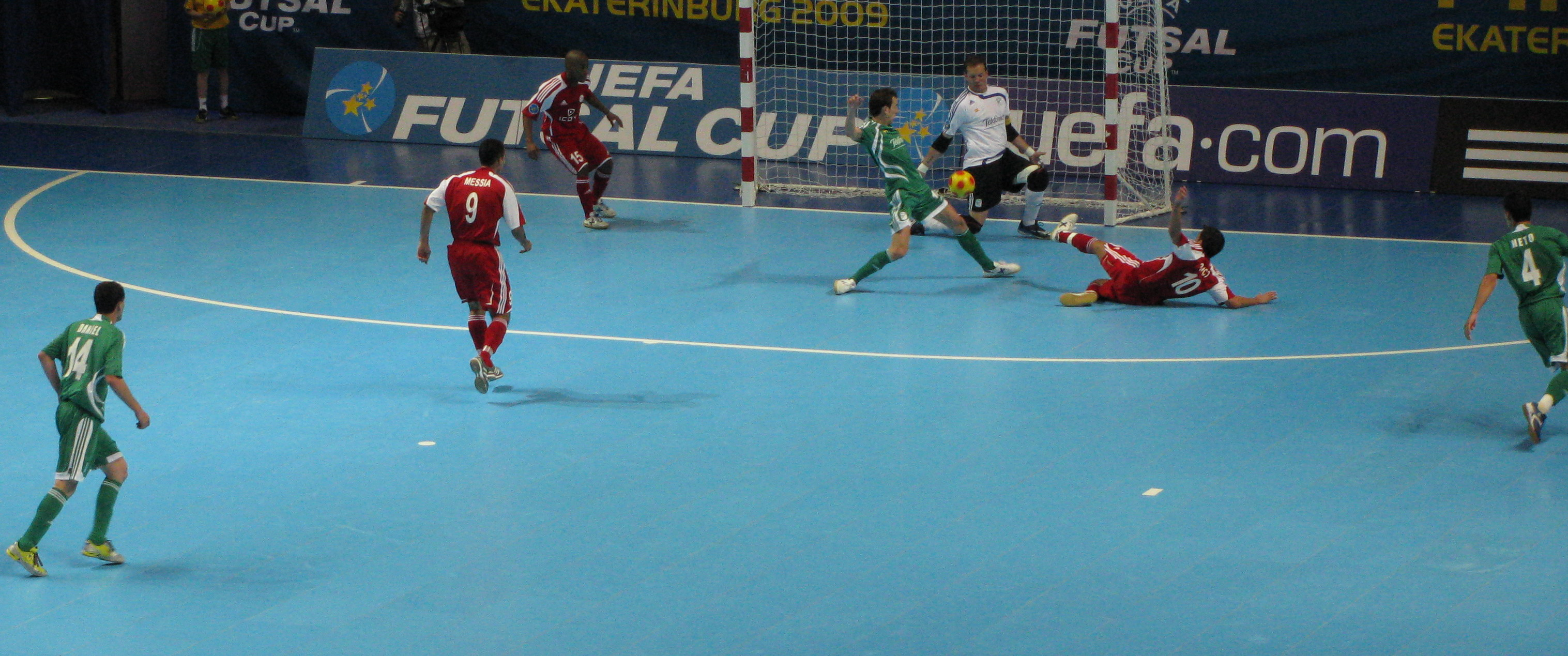
View from inside: futsal game

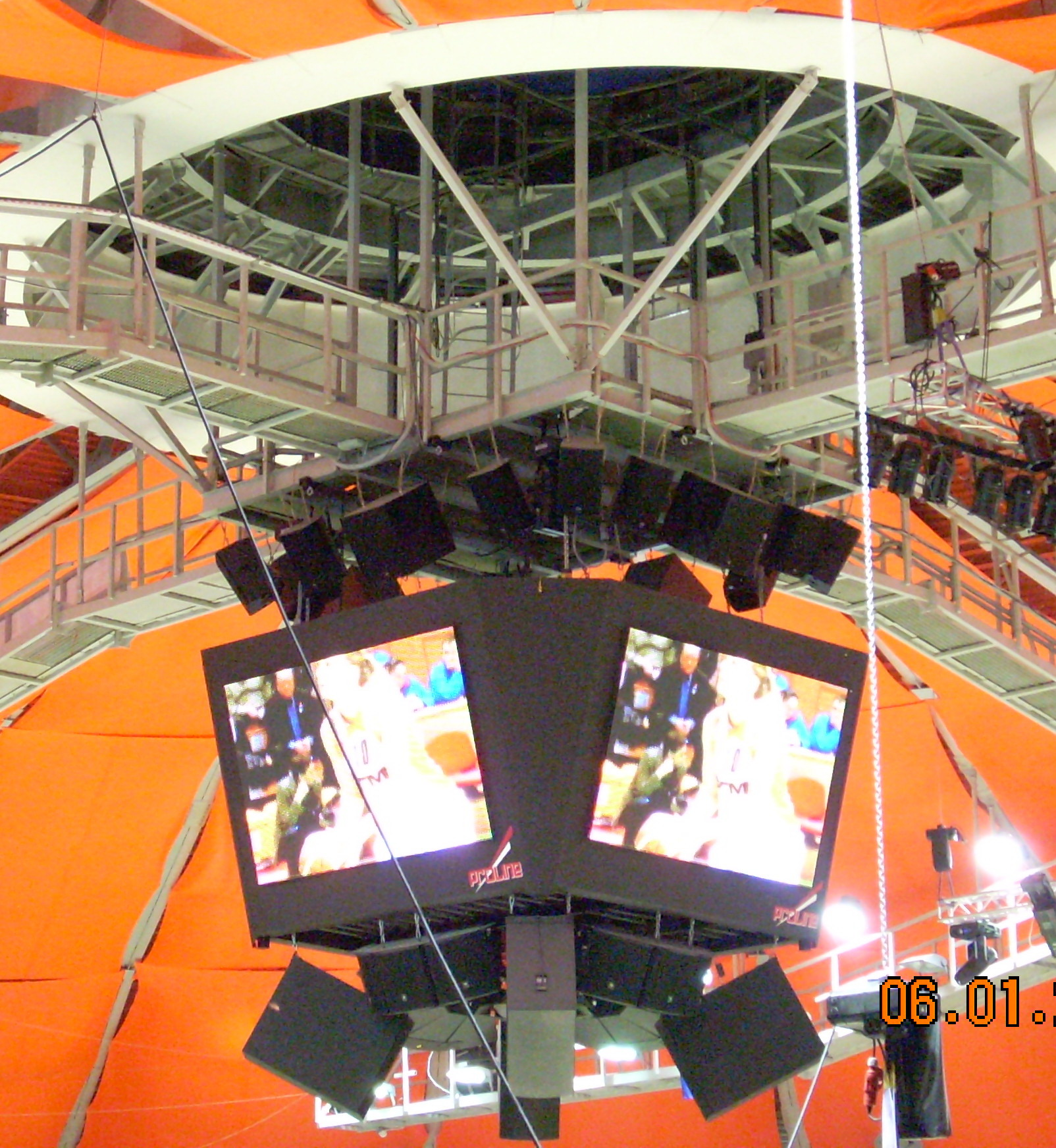
Scoreboard

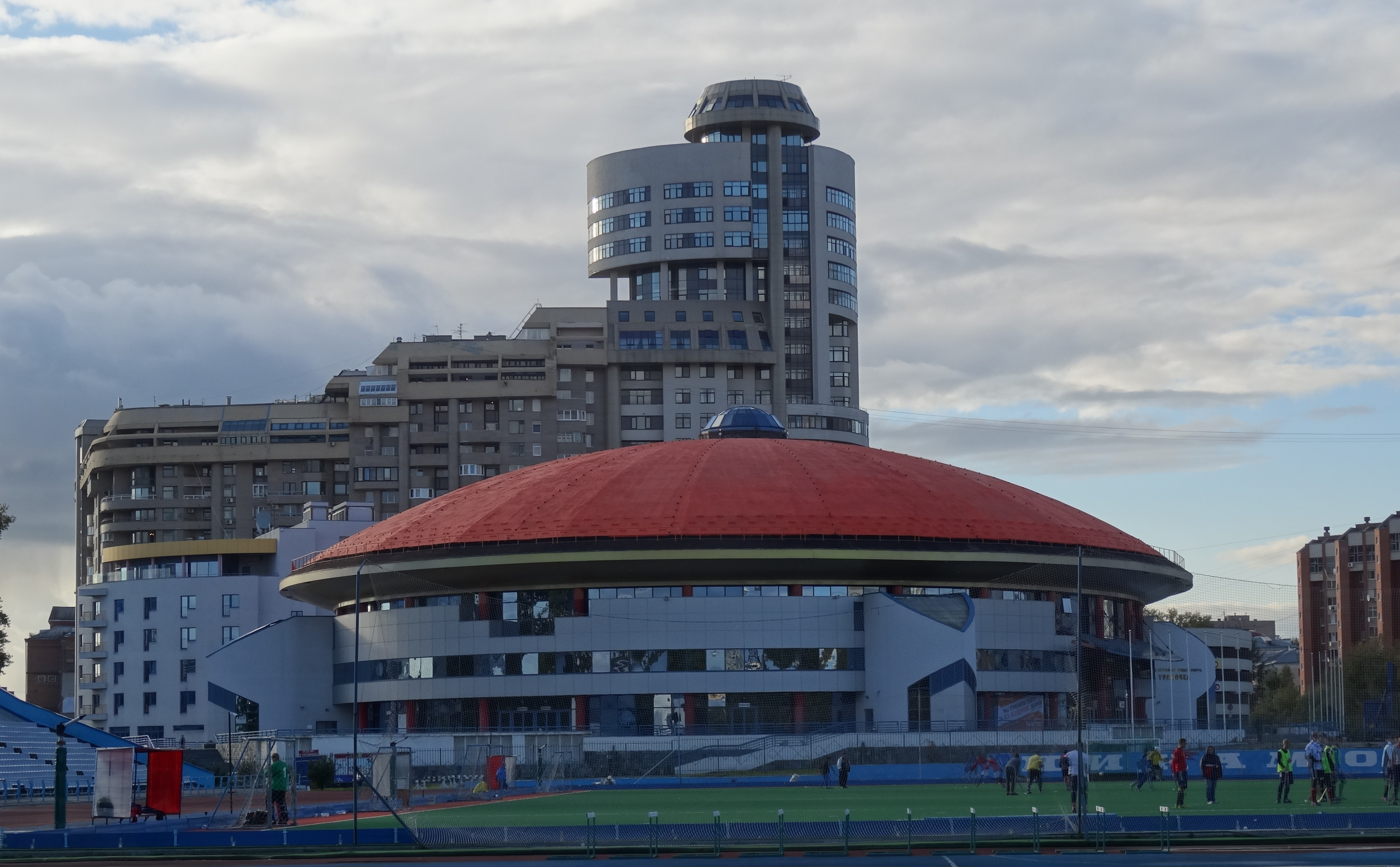
View from the southeast

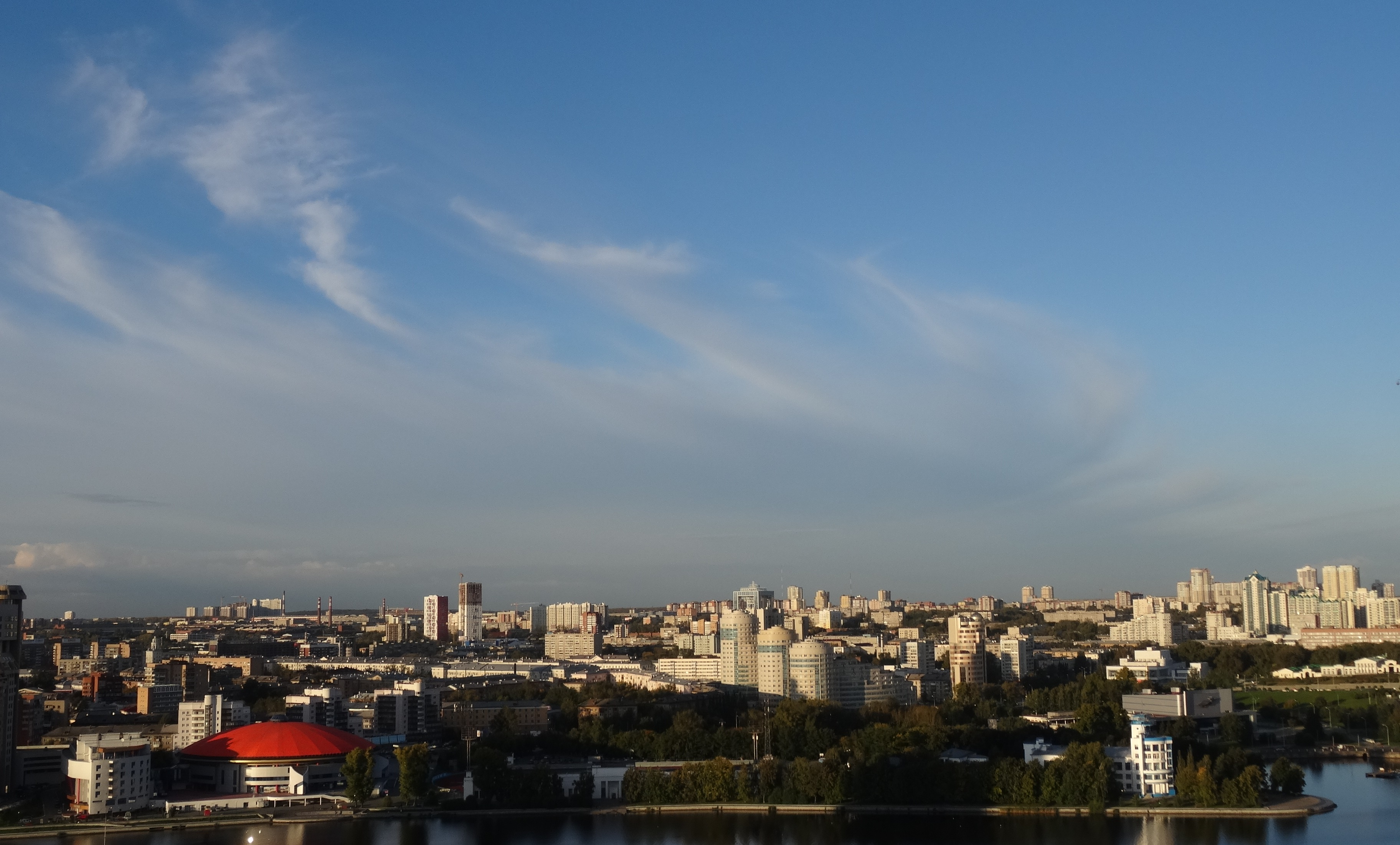
DIVS and the Dinamo Sport Complex
