= KRK Uralets =

Sporting arena in Yekaterinburg, Russia

Coordinates: 56.817345°N 60.594998°E

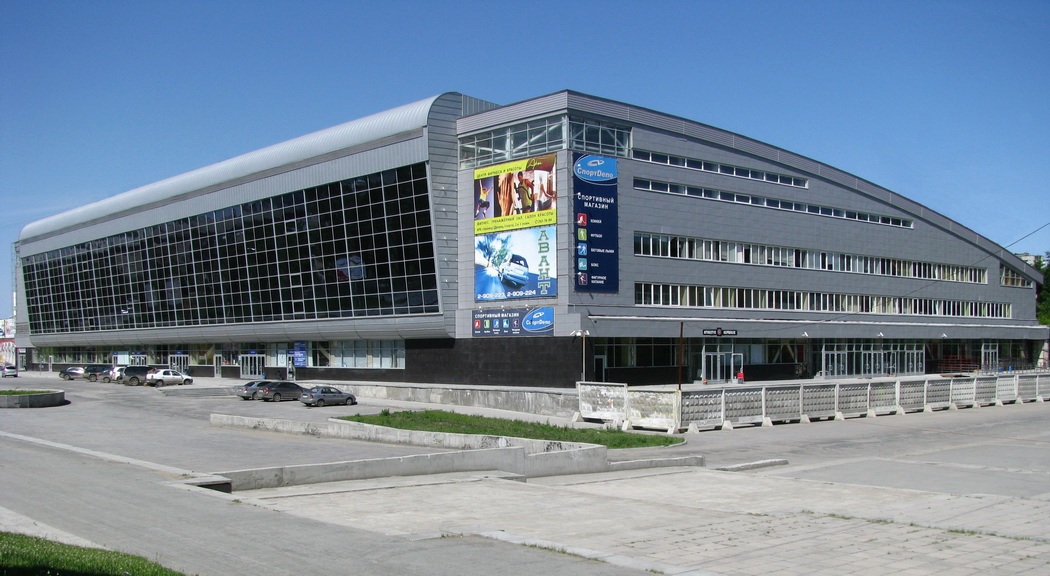
- Interactive map of KRK Uralets
- Location: Yekaterinburg, Russia
- Capacity: Ice hockey 5,545

Construction
- Opened: 1970

Tenants
- Avtomobilist Yekaterinburg (KHL) (2006–2025); Avto (MHL) (2009–present)

KRK Uralets is an indoor sporting arena located in Yekaterinburg, Russia. It is used for various indoor events and is the home arena of the Avtomobilist Yekaterinburg ice hockey club. The capacity of the arena is 5,545 spectators.

KRK Uralets was built in 1972. Reconstructed in 2006, the complex also serves as one of the city's concert venues.

It was the venue of the 2016 Russian Figure Skating Championships.

== See also ==
- List of indoor arenas in Russia
- List of Kontinental Hockey League arenas
