= 2020 European Men's U-20 Handball Championship =

13th edition of the European Men's U-20 Handball Championship

2020 European Men's Under-20 Handball Championship
Tournament details
- Host country: Croatia
- Venue(s): 2 (in 2 host cities)
- Dates: 7–17 January 2021 (cancelled)
- Teams: 16 (from 1 confederation)

The 2020 European Men's U-20 Handball Championship was going to be the 13th edition of the European Men's U-20 Handball Championship, and was planned to be held in Poreč, Croatia from 7 to 17 January 2021.

It was originally scheduled to take place from 2 to 12 July 2020 in Innsbruck, Austria and Brixen, Italy. On 27 October 2020, the EHF cancelled the tournament due to the COVID-19 pandemic.

== Qualification ==
Competition	Dates	Host	Vacancies	Qualified
Men's 18 EHF EURO 2018	9–19 August 2018	(Croatia) Koprivnica	14	Sweden; Iceland; Denmark; Croatia; Spain; Germany; France; Serbia; Slovenia; Hungary; Norway; Portugal; Russia; Israel
Men's 18 EHF Championship 2018	10–19 August 2018	(Austria) Tulln an der Donau	1	Austria
Men's 18 EHF Championship 2018	10–19 August 2018	(Georgia (country)) Tbilisi	1	Italy

== Draw ==
The draw was held on 15 January 2020 in Vienna.

Pot 1	Pot 2	Pot 3	Pot 4
Sweden; Iceland; Denmark; Croatia	Spain; Germany; France; Serbia	Slovenia; Hungary; Norway; Portugal	Russia; Israel; Austria; Italy

== Preliminary round ==
=== Group A ===
Pos	Team	Pld	W	D	L	GF	GA	GD	Pts	Qualification
1	Iceland	0	0	0	0	0	0	0	0	Main round
2	Serbia	0	0	0	0	0	0	0	0	Main round
3	Norway	0	0	0	0	0	0	0	0	Intermediate round
4	Austria	0	0	0	0	0	0	0	0	Intermediate round

First match(es) will be played: unknown. Source:
Rules for classification: 1) points; 2) head-to-head points; 3) head-to-head goal difference; 4) head-to-head number of goals scored; 5) Goal difference.

=== Group B ===
Pos	Team	Pld	W	D	L	GF	GA	GD	Pts	Qualification
1	Sweden	0	0	0	0	0	0	0	0	Main round
2	France	0	0	0	0	0	0	0	0	Main round
3	Portugal	0	0	0	0	0	0	0	0	Intermediate round
4	Russia	0	0	0	0	0	0	0	0	Intermediate round

First match(es) will be played: unknown. Source:
Rules for classification: 1) points; 2) head-to-head points; 3) head-to-head goal difference; 4) head-to-head number of goals scored; 5) Goal difference.

=== Group C ===
Pos	Team	Pld	W	D	L	GF	GA	GD	Pts	Qualification
1	Croatia (H)	0	0	0	0	0	0	0	0	Main round
2	Spain	0	0	0	0	0	0	0	0	Main round
3	Slovenia	0	0	0	0	0	0	0	0	Intermediate round
4	Italy	0	0	0	0	0	0	0	0	Intermediate round

First match(es) will be played: unknown. Source:
Rules for classification: 1) points; 2) head-to-head points; 3) head-to-head goal difference; 4) head-to-head number of goals scored; 5) Goal difference.
(H) Hosts

=== Group D ===
Pos	Team	Pld	W	D	L	GF	GA	GD	Pts	Qualification
1	Denmark	0	0	0	0	0	0	0	0	Main round
2	Germany	0	0	0	0	0	0	0	0	Main round
3	Hungary	0	0	0	0	0	0	0	0	Intermediate round
4	Israel	0	0	0	0	0	0	0	0	Intermediate round

First match(es) will be played: unknown. Source:
Rules for classification: 1) points; 2) head-to-head points; 3) head-to-head goal difference; 4) head-to-head number of goals scored; 5) Goal difference.
