= 2027 IHF Men's U21 Handball World Championship =

Tournament details
- Host country: North Macedonia
- Dates: 23 June – 4 July
- Teams: 32 (from 5 confederations)

The 2027 IHF Men's U21 Handball World Championship will be the 26th edition of the IHF Men's U21 Handball World Championship, held in North Macedonia under the aegis of International Handball Federation (IHF). It will be held from 23 June to 4 July 2027.

== Qualification ==
Event	Dates	Host	Vacancies	Qualified
IHF Council Meeting	28 February 2020	(Egypt) Cairo	1	North Macedonia
2026 U-20 European Championship	8–19 July 2026	(Romania) Cluj-Napoca	15	Austria; Denmark; Faroe Islands; France; Germany; Hungary; Iceland; Israel; Norway; Portugal; Romania; Slovenia; Spain; Sweden; Switzerland
2026 Asian Junior Championship	15–27 July 2026	(China) Chuzhou	4	Bahrain; Saudi Arabia; South Korea; United Arab Emirates
2026 African Junior Championship	5–12 September 2026	(Ivory Coast) Abidjan	5	Angola; Egypt; Guinea; Nigeria; Tunisia
2026 North America and Caribbean Junior Championship	28 October – 1 November 2026	(Canada) Quebec City	2	Cuba; Mexico
2026 South and Central American Junior Championship	10–14 November 2026	(Paraguay) Asunción	3	Argentina; Brazil; Chile
Wildcard		—	1	
IHF Trophy Inter-Continental Phase			1	
