= 1993 Men's Junior World Handball Championship =

1993 Men's Junior World Championship
Tournament details
- Host country: Egypt
- Dates: 8–18 September 1993
- Teams: 16 (from 3 confederations)

Final positions
- Champions: Egypt (1st title)
- Runners-up: Denmark
- Third place: Iceland
- Fourth place: Russia

Tournament statistics
- Matches played: 54

The 1993 Men's Junior Handball Championship was the 9th instance of the World Junior Men's Handball Championship. The 1993 IHF Men's Junior World Championship was the 9th edition of the tournament and was held in Egypt from September 8–18, 1993.

== Groups for the preliminary round ==
Group A	Group B	Group C	Group D
Denmark; Poland; South Korea; Spain	Russia; Hungary; Norway; Algeria	Sweden; Argentina; Portugal; Austria	Egypt; Iceland; Romania; Greece

== Results ==
=== Preliminary stage ===
The teams placed first, second and third (shaded in green) qualified to the main round.

==== Group A ====
Team	Pld	W	D	L	GF	GA	GD	Pts
Denmark	3	2	0	1	76	64	+12	4
Spain	3	1	1	1	72	55	+17	3
Poland	3	1	1	1	59	63	−4	3
South Korea	3	1	0	2	61	86	−25	2

Denmark	29–17	Poland
	(10 – 8)

Spain	35–17	South Korea
	(16 – 6)

South Korea	25–24	Denmark
	(13 – 9)

Poland	15–15	Spain
	(7 – 7)

South Korea	19–27	Poland
	(8 – 14)

Spain	22–23	Denmark
	(10 – 12)

==== Group B ====
Team	Pld	W	D	L	GF	GA	GD	Pts
Russia	3	2	0	1	80	61	+19	4
Hungary	3	2	0	1	72	77	−5	4
Norway	3	1	0	2	72	73	−1	2
Algeria	3	1	0	2	59	72	−13	2

Norway	26–20	Algeria
	(15 – 9)

Russia	26–27	Hungary
	(14 – 14)

Hungary	25–23	Norway
	(8 – 12)

Algeria	11–26	Russia
	(6 – 13)

Hungary	20–28	Algeria
	(8 – 12)

Russia	28–23	Norway
	(17 – 9)

==== Group C ====
Team	Pld	W	D	L	GF	GA	GD	Pts
Sweden	3	3	0	0	64	57	+7	6
Argentina	3	1	1	1	61	56	+5	3
Portugal	3	1	1	1	54	56	−2	3
Austria	3	0	0	3	56	66	−10	0

Portugal	18–18	Argentina
	(10 – 5)

Sweden	23–21	Austria
	(10 – 12)

Austria	19–21	Portugal
	(9 – 9)

Argentina	21–22	Sweden
	(10 – 11)

Austria	16–22	Argentina
	(10 – 8)

Sweden	19–15	Portugal
	(10 – 6)

==== Group D ====
Team	Pld	W	D	L	GF	GA	GD	Pts
Egypt	3	2	0	1	84	68	+16	4
Iceland	3	2	0	1	85	75	+10	4
Romania	3	2	0	1	79	79	0	4
Greece	3	0	0	3	66	92	−26	0

Romania	20–29	Egypt
	(7 – 13)

Iceland	33–20	Greece
	(18 – 10)

Greece	24–29	Romania
	(6 – 11)

Egypt	25–26	Iceland
	(13 – 11)

Iceland	26–30	Romania
	(9 – 16)

Greece	22–30	Egypt
	(10 – 16)

== Groups for the main round ==
=== Group I ===
Team	Pld	W	D	L	GF	GA	GD	Pts
Denmark	5	4	0	1	136	104	+32	8
Russia	5	3	0	2	127	116	+11	6
Hungary	5	3	0	2	118	124	−6	6
Norway	5	2	0	3	113	130	−17	4
Spain	5	1	1	3	104	108	−4	3
Poland	5	1	1	3	99	115	−16	3

Denmark	29–16	Norway
	(14 – 10)

Spain	21–26	Hungary
	(8 – 8)

Poland	18–25	Russia
	(5 – 16)

Hungary	20–30	Denmark
	(10 – 11)

Russia	19–23	Spain
	(6 – 12)

Norway	16–25	Poland
	(9 – 13)

Poland	24–20	Hungary
	(11 – 9)

Spain	23–25	Norway
	(13 – 12)

Denmark	25–29	Russia
	(16 – 14)

=== Group II ===
Team	Pld	W	D	L	GF	GA	GD	Pts
Egypt	5	4	0	1	127	98	+29	8
Iceland	5	4	0	1	134	117	+17	8
Sweden	5	3	0	2	102	99	+3	6
Romania	5	3	0	2	118	126	−8	6
Portugal	5	0	1	4	102	122	−20	1
Argentina	5	0	1	4	94	115	−21	1

Sweden	26–19	Romania
	(12 – 9)

Argentina	22–30	Iceland
	(7 – 15)

Portugal	23–26	Egypt
	(12 – 11)

Iceland	21–19	Sweden
	(9 – 7)

Egypt	24–13	Argentina
	(12 – 5)

Romania	28–25	Portugal
	(15 – 10)

Portugal	21–31	Iceland
	(11 – 17)

Argentina	20–21	Romania
	(9 – 10)

Sweden	16–23	Egypt
	(8 – 11)

== Placement matches (13–16th place) ==
Team	Pld	W	D	L	GF	GA	GD	Pts
Algeria	3	3	0	0	66	51	+15	6
Austria	3	2	0	1	69	64	+5	4
South Korea	3	1	0	2	74	72	+2	2
Greece	3	0	0	3	63	85	−22	0

South Korea	24–28	Austria
	(12 – 14)

Algeria	29–16	Greece
	(15 – 6)

Greece	23–30	South Korea
	(13 – 16)

Austria	15–16	Algeria
	(8 – 10)

South Korea	20–21	Algeria
	(6 – 10)

Austria	26–24	Greece
	(11 – 13)

== Placement Matches (3–12th Place) ==
=== 11th/12th ===
Argentina
33 – 29
Poland

(6–10)

FT: 27–27

=== 9th/10th ===
Spain	24 – 22	Portugal
	(11–12)

=== 7th/8th ===
Romania	29 – 30	Norway
	(17–13)

=== 5th/6th ===
Hungary	29 – 30	Sweden
	(12–15)

=== 3rd/4th ===
Iceland	21 – 20	Russia
	(15–9)

== Final ==
18 September	Denmark	19 – 22	Egypt	Cairo Stadium Hall 1, Cairo; Attendance: 32,000
18 September		(8–14)		Cairo Stadium Hall 1, Cairo; Attendance: 32,000

== Ranking and statistics ==
=== Final ranking ===
1st place, gold medalist(s)	Egypt
2nd place, silver medalist(s)	Denmark
3rd place, bronze medalist(s)	Iceland
4	Russia
5	Sweden
6	Hungary
7	Norway
8	Romania
9	Spain
10	Portugal
11	Argentina
12	Poland
13	Algeria
14	Austria
15	South Korea
16	Greece

1993 Men's Junior World Champions

Egypt
First Title

Team roster

Mohamed Bakir El-Nakib, Sherif Moemen Hegazy, Gohar Nabil, Hatem Dawoud, Ashraf Mabrouk Awaad, Mohi Hafez, Mahmoud Hussein, Serag El-Din Sherif, Magdy Abou El-Magd, Ayman El-Alfy, Saber Hussein, Hazem Mabrouk Awaad, Marwan Ragab, Mohamed El-Roubi, Wael Fahim, Sherif Abou El-Abbas.
Head coach: Gamal Shams.
