= Yohan Delattre =

French handball player and coach (born 1968)

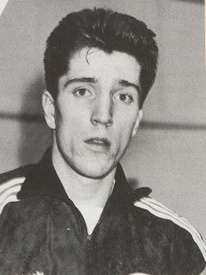
- Delattre in 1988

Personal information
- Nationality: French
- Born: 24 January 1968 (age 58) Lille, France
- Height: 185 cm (73 in)

Sport
- Sport: Handball
- Position: Goalkeeper
- Current club: Dunkerque HGL

Youth career
- Years: Team
- –: Lille Université Club

Senior clubs
- Years: Team
- ?–1991: Lille Université Club
- 1991–1993: Lille Villeneuve d'Ascq
- 1993–1994: USAM Nîmes
- 1994–1996: OM Vitrolles
- 1996–2004: Lille Villeneuve d'Ascq
National team
Years	Team	Apps
1990–1999	France	74

Teams managed
- 2003–2005: France junior
- 2005–2007: Lille Villeneuve d’Ascq
- 2012–2024: France junior
- 2024–1/2026: France assistant
- 1/2026–: Dunkerque HGL
Medal record
World Championship
Gold medal – first place	1995 Iceland
Bronze medal – third place	1997 Japan

Yohan Delattre (born 24 January 1968) is a French former handball goalkeeper and current coach, who is currently the head coach of Dunkerque HGL. He won the 1995 World Championship with the French national team.

Delattre started playing for Lille Université Club, and after the fusion with HBC Villeneuve d’Ascq in 1991 for Lille Métropole Handball Club Villeneuve d’Ascq in the second best french league. In 1993 he joined USAM Nîmes. Here he won the 1994 Coupe de France. In 1995 he joined OM Vitrolles. Here he won the 1995 and 1996 French Championship. When the team went bankrupt in 1996, he returned to Lille Métropole Handball Club Villeneuve d’Ascq, who played in the second division at the time. In his first season he was promoted with the club, but three years later, in the 1999-2000 season, he and the club were relegated again. Three years later he retired.

== National team ==
He made his debut for the French national team in 1990. He represented them at the 1994 European Men's Handball Championship, where France finished sixth. He played one game. A year later he won a gold medal at the 1995 World Championship. He competed in the men's tournament at the 1996 Summer Olympics, where France finished 4th. At the 1997 World Championship he won bronze medals, beating Hungary in the third place playoff. His last tournament for france was the 1999 World Championship, where France finished 6th.

== Coaching career ==
After retiring from playing, he became a coach for the French junior national team. In 2005 he returned to Lille to coach his former club.

In 2012 he became the head coach of the French junior national team. Here he guided the team to gold medals at the 2015 and 2019, as well as bronze at the 2016 European Men's U-20 Handball Championship and silver at the 2018 European Men's U-20 Handball Championship.

In 2024 he became the assistant coach on the French national team under Guillaume Gille. He was then part of the staff, when France won bronze medals at the 2025 World Men's Handball Championship.

In Junuary 2026 he took over as the head coach of Dunkerque HGL, until the end of the 2025-26 season. Dunkerque were struggling against relegation at the time. After the 2026 European Championship he ceased to be the assistant coach for France, when Gille left the head coach position and was replaced by Talant Dujshebaev.
