= Nikolaj Hansen =

Nikolaj Hansen may refer to:

- Nikolaj Hansen (footballer, born 1987), Danish footballer for FC Roskilde
- Nikolaj Hansen (footballer, born 1993), Danish footballer for Víkingur
- Niko Hansen (born 1994), Danish footballer for Columbus Crew SC

== See also ==
- Nikolaj Koch-Hansen (born 1986), Danish handball player
