= Hungary men's national junior handball team =

Hungary

Information
- Association: Hungarian Handball Federation

Colours
1st	2nd

Results

IHF U-21 World Championship
- Appearances: 16 (First in 1977)
- Best result: (silver) Runners-Up (1977, 2023)

European Junior Championship
- Best result: (gold) Champions (2026)
- Last updated on Unknown.

The Hungary national junior handball team is the national under-20 handball team of Hungary. Controlled by the Hungarian Handball Federation that is an affiliate of the International Handball Federation IHF as well as a member of the European Handball Federation EHF. The team represents Hungary in international matches.

== History ==
=== IHF Junior World Championship record ===
Champions Runners up Third place Fourth place

Year	Round	Position	GP	W	D	L	GS	GA	GD
1977 (Sweden)	Final	2nd place							
1979 (Denmark) / (Sweden)		6th place							
1981 (Portugal)	Didn't Qualify								
1983 (Finland)	Didn't Qualify								
1985 (Italy)	Didn't Qualify								
1987 (Socialist Federal Republic of Yugoslavia)		7th place							
1989 (Spain)		10th place							
1991 (Greece)		10th place							
1993 (Egypt)		6th place							
1995 (Argentina)	Didn't Qualify								
1997 (Turkey)	Didn't Qualify								
1999 (Qatar)		16th place							
2001 (Switzerland)	Semi-Finals	4th place							
2003 (Brazil)		15th place							
2005 (Hungary)	Semi-Finals	3rd place							
2007 (North Macedonia)	Didn't Qualify								
2009 (Egypt)	Didn't Qualify								
2011 (Greece)		17th place							
2013 (Bosnia and Herzegovina)		12th place							
2015 (Brazil)	Didn't Qualify								
2017 (Algeria)		5th place							
2019 (Spain)		15th place							
2023 (Germany) (Greece)	Final	2nd place							
2025 (Poland)		10th place							
Total	16/24	0 Titles							

=== EHF European Junior Championship ===
Champions Runners up Third place Fourth place

European Junior Championship record
Year	Round	Position	GP	W	D	L	GS	GA	GD
(Romania) 1996	Didn't Qualify								
(Austria) 1998	Semi-finals	Third place							
(Greece) 2000		6th place							
(Poland) 2002	Didn't Qualify								
(Latvia) 2004	Semi-finals	4th place							
(Austria) 2006	Didn't Qualify								
(Romania) 2008		10th place							
(Slovakia) 2010	Didn't Qualify								
(Turkey) 2012	Didn't Qualify								
(Austria) 2014		9th place							
(Denmark) 2016		10th place							
(Slovenia) 2018		11th place							
(Portugal) 2022		5th place							
(Slovenia) 2024		12th place							
(Romania) 2026	Final	Champions							
Total	10/15	1 Titles							

== Squad ==
Last world championship

- 1 NAGY Martin
- 2 TOTH Peter
- 5 KERKOVITS Gyula
- 7 UBORNYAK David
- 8 CSOMOR Tamas
- 13 KECSKES Daniel
- 16 GYORI Kristof
- 18 SPEKHARDT Gergo
- 20 GABOR Marcell
- 21 SZITA Zoltan
- 26 KRISTOF Matyas
- 27 SZUCS Bence
- 44 SCHAFFER Zsolt
- 45 ROSTA Miklos
- 48 BORZAS Uros
- 99 MATHE Dominik
