= Portugal men's national junior handball team =

Portugal

Information
- Association: Portuguese Handball Federation

Colours
1st	2nd

Results

IHF U-21 World Championship
- Appearances: 12 (First in 1979)
- Best result: (silver) Runners-up (2025)

European Junior Championship
- Best result: (silver) Runners-up (2010, 2022, 2024)
- Last updated on Unknown.

The Portugal national junior handball team is the national under-20 handball team of Portugal. Controlled by the Portuguese Handball Federation, that is an affiliate of the International Handball Federation IHF as well as a member of the European Handball Federation EHF, The team represents Portugal in international matches.

== Statistics ==
=== IHF Junior World Championship record ===
Champions Runners up Third place Fourth place

Year	Round	Position	GP	W	D	L	GS	GA	GD
1977 (Sweden)	Didn't Qualify								
1979 (Denmark) (Sweden)		18th place							
1981 (Portugal)		15th place							
1983 (Finland)	Didn't Qualify								
1985 (Italy)	Didn't Qualify								
1987 (Socialist Federal Republic of Yugoslavia)	Didn't Qualify								
1989 (Spain)	Didn't Qualify								
1991 (Greece)	Didn't Qualify								
1993 (Egypt)		10th place							
1995 (Argentina)	Semi-Finals	3rd place							
1997 (Turkey)	Didn't Qualify								
1999 (Qatar)		10th place							
2001 (Switzerland)	Didn't Qualify								
2003 (Brazil)	Didn't Qualify								
2005 (Hungary)	Didn't Qualify								
2007 (North Macedonia)		15th place							
2009 (Egypt)	Quarter-Finals	7th place							
2011 (Greece)		9th place							
2013 (Bosnia and Herzegovina)	Didn't Qualify								
2015 (Brazil)		14th place							
2017 (Algeria)	Didn't Qualify								
2019 (Spain)	Semi-Finals	4th place							
2023 (Germany) (Greece)	Quarter-Finals	6th place							
2025 (Poland)	Final	Runners-up							
Total	12/24	0 Titles							

=== EHF European Junior Championship ===
Champions Runners up Third place Fourth place

European Junior Championship record
Year	Round	Position	GP	W	D	L	GS	GA	GD
(Romania) 1996		7th place							
(Austria) 1998	Didn't Qualify								
(Greece) 2000	Didn't Qualify								
(Poland) 2002		10th place							
(Latvia) 2004		8th place							
(Austria) 2006	Didn't Qualify								
(Romania) 2008		7th place							
(Slovakia) 2010	Final	Runners-Up							
(Turkey) 2012		5th place							
(Austria) 2014	Didn't Qualify								
(Denmark) 2016	Didn't Qualify								
(Slovenia) 2018	Semi-finals	4th place							
(Portugal) 2022	Final	Runners-Up							
(Slovenia) 2024	Final	Runners-Up							
(Romania) 2026	Intermediate round	9th place							
Total	10/15	0 Titles							
