= 2018 European Men's U-20 Handball Championship =

Tournament details
- Host country: Slovenia
- Venue(s): 2 (in 1 host city)
- Dates: 19–29 July
- Teams: 16 (from 1 confederation)

Final positions
- Champions: Slovenia (1st title)
- Runners-up: France
- Third place: Germany
- Fourth place: Portugal

Tournament statistics
- Matches played: 56
- Goals scored: 3,101 (55.38 per match)
- Attendance: 23,950 (428 per match)
- Top scorer(s): (Slovenia) Gregor Ocvirk (57 goals)

Awards
- Best player: (Portugal) Diogo Silva

The 2018 European Men's U-20 Handball Championship was the twelfth edition of the European Men's U-20 Handball Championship, held in Celje, Slovenia from 19 to 29 July 2018.

== Qualified teams ==
- Croatia
- Denmark
- France
- Germany
- Hungary
- Iceland
- Israel
- Norway
- Poland
- Portugal
- Romania
- Russia
- Serbia
- Slovenia
- Spain
- Sweden

== Draw ==
The draw was held on 19 February 2018 in Celje.

Pot 1	Pot 2	Pot 3	Pot 4
France; Croatia; Germany; Slovenia	Denmark; Spain; Iceland; Serbia	Sweden; Portugal; Russia; Norway	Poland; Hungary; Israel; Romania

== Preliminary round ==
All times are local (UTC+2).

=== Group A ===
Pos	Team	Pld	W	D	L	GF	GA	GD	Pts	Qualification
1	Germany	3	1	2	0	77	72	+5	4	Main round
2	Iceland	3	1	1	1	79	87	−8	3 (Note: Iceland 35–33 Sweden)	Main round
3	Sweden	3	1	1	1	95	88	+7	3	Intermediate round
4	Romania	3	1	0	2	85	89	−4	2	Intermediate round

Source: EHF
Rules for classification: 1) points; 2) head-to-head points; 3) head-to-head goal difference; 4) head-to-head number of goals scored; 5) Goal difference.
Notes:

19 July 2018; 13:00	Germany	22–22	Sweden	Golovec Hall, Celje; Attendance: 100; Referees: Konjičanin, Konjičanin (BIH)
19 July 2018; 13:00	Schreiber 8	(13–12)	Windahl 6	Golovec Hall, Celje; Attendance: 100; Referees: Konjičanin, Konjičanin (BIH)
19 July 2018; 13:00	3× (yellow card) 4× (suspension)	Report	3× (yellow card) 4× (suspension)	Golovec Hall, Celje; Attendance: 100; Referees: Konjičanin, Konjičanin (BIH)

19 July 2018; 15:00	Iceland	19–29	Romania	Golovec Hall, Celje; Attendance: 100; Referees: Tzaferopoulos, Bethmann (GRE)
19 July 2018; 15:00	three players 3	(5–15)	Hanțaru 7	Golovec Hall, Celje; Attendance: 100; Referees: Tzaferopoulos, Bethmann (GRE)
19 July 2018; 15:00	2× (yellow card) 5× (suspension)	Report	1× (yellow card) 5× (suspension) 1× (red card)	Golovec Hall, Celje; Attendance: 100; Referees: Tzaferopoulos, Bethmann (GRE)

20 July 2018; 13:00	Romania	25–30	Germany	Golovec Hall, Celje; Attendance: 150; Referees: Andorka, Hucker (HUN)
20 July 2018; 13:00	Căbuț 7	(15–17)	Stutzke 9	Golovec Hall, Celje; Attendance: 150; Referees: Andorka, Hucker (HUN)
20 July 2018; 13:00	1× (yellow card) 1× (suspension)	Report	1× (yellow card) 5× (suspension)	Golovec Hall, Celje; Attendance: 150; Referees: Andorka, Hucker (HUN)

20 July 2018; 15:00	Sweden	33–35	Iceland	Golovec Hall, Celje; Attendance: 250; Referees: Mitrevski, Todorovski (MKD)
20 July 2018; 15:00	Salihi 10	(12–19)	Þorkelsson 8	Golovec Hall, Celje; Attendance: 250; Referees: Mitrevski, Todorovski (MKD)
20 July 2018; 15:00	2× (yellow card) 8× (suspension)	Report	1× (yellow card) 7× (suspension) 1× (red card)	Golovec Hall, Celje; Attendance: 250; Referees: Mitrevski, Todorovski (MKD)

22 July 2018; 13:00	Germany	25–25	Iceland	Golovec Hall, Celje; Attendance: 300; Referees: Freitas, Carvalho (POR)
22 July 2018; 13:00	Michel, Simak 5	(16–12)	Jóhannsson 6	Golovec Hall, Celje; Attendance: 300; Referees: Freitas, Carvalho (POR)
22 July 2018; 13:00	2× (yellow card) 6× (suspension)	Report	1× (yellow card) 5× (suspension)	Golovec Hall, Celje; Attendance: 300; Referees: Freitas, Carvalho (POR)

22 July 2018; 15:00	Sweden	40–31	Romania	Golovec Hall, Celje; Attendance: 200; Referees: Vitaku, Vitaku (KOS)
22 July 2018; 15:00	Wallinius 9	(17–16)	three players 5	Golovec Hall, Celje; Attendance: 200; Referees: Vitaku, Vitaku (KOS)
22 July 2018; 15:00	4× (yellow card) 7× (suspension)	Report	3× (yellow card) 2× (suspension)	Golovec Hall, Celje; Attendance: 200; Referees: Vitaku, Vitaku (KOS)

=== Group B ===
Pos	Team	Pld	W	D	L	GF	GA	GD	Pts	Qualification
1	Slovenia (H)	3	3	0	0	82	66	+16	6	Main round
2	Serbia	3	2	0	1	88	82	+6	4	Main round
3	Israel	3	1	0	2	82	88	−6	2	Intermediate round
4	Norway	3	0	0	3	71	87	−16	0	Intermediate round

Source: EHF
Rules for classification: 1) points; 2) head-to-head points; 3) head-to-head goal difference; 4) head-to-head number of goals scored; 5) Goal difference.
(H) Hosts

19 July 2018; 17:00	Serbia	35–28	Israel	Golovec Hall, Celje; Attendance: 200; Referees: Andorka, Hucker (HUN)
19 July 2018; 17:00	Maksić 9	(21–13)	Sarfati, Sless 4	Golovec Hall, Celje; Attendance: 200; Referees: Andorka, Hucker (HUN)
19 July 2018; 17:00	3× (yellow card) 2× (suspension)	Report	2× (yellow card) 3× (suspension)	Golovec Hall, Celje; Attendance: 200; Referees: Andorka, Hucker (HUN)

19 July 2018; 19:30	Slovenia	27–19	Norway	Golovec Hall, Celje; Attendance: 1,200; Referees: Freitas, Carvalho (POR)
19 July 2018; 19:30	Ocvirk 5	(11–9)	three players 4	Golovec Hall, Celje; Attendance: 1,200; Referees: Freitas, Carvalho (POR)
19 July 2018; 19:30	1× (yellow card) 6× (suspension)	Report	1× (yellow card) 6× (suspension)	Golovec Hall, Celje; Attendance: 1,200; Referees: Freitas, Carvalho (POR)

20 July 2018; 17:00	Norway	27–30	Serbia	Golovec Hall, Celje; Attendance: 200; Referees: Panayides, Andreou (CYP)
20 July 2018; 17:00	Heldal 9	(12–18)	Pisarić 8	Golovec Hall, Celje; Attendance: 200; Referees: Panayides, Andreou (CYP)
20 July 2018; 17:00	3× (yellow card) 4× (suspension)	Report	1× (yellow card) 3× (suspension)	Golovec Hall, Celje; Attendance: 200; Referees: Panayides, Andreou (CYP)

20 July 2018; 19:00	Israel	24–28	Slovenia	Golovec Hall, Celje; Attendance: 600; Referees: Tzaferopoulos, Bethmann (GRE)
20 July 2018; 19:00	Cohen 8	(13–15)	Ocvirk 11	Golovec Hall, Celje; Attendance: 600; Referees: Tzaferopoulos, Bethmann (GRE)
20 July 2018; 19:00	2× (yellow card) 5× (suspension)	Report	3× (yellow card) 3× (suspension)	Golovec Hall, Celje; Attendance: 600; Referees: Tzaferopoulos, Bethmann (GRE)

22 July 2018; 17:00	Norway	25–30	Israel	Golovec Hall, Celje; Attendance: 300; Referees: Vešović, Mitrović (MNE)
22 July 2018; 17:00	Boilesen 6	(10–15)	Cohen 9	Golovec Hall, Celje; Attendance: 300; Referees: Vešović, Mitrović (MNE)
22 July 2018; 17:00	3× (yellow card) 5× (suspension)	Report	3× (yellow card) 4× (suspension)	Golovec Hall, Celje; Attendance: 300; Referees: Vešović, Mitrović (MNE)

22 July 2018; 19:00	Slovenia	27–23	Serbia	Golovec Hall, Celje; Attendance: 2,000; Referees: Andorka, Hucker (HUN)
22 July 2018; 19:00	Ocvirk 12	(14–13)	Maksić 8	Golovec Hall, Celje; Attendance: 2,000; Referees: Andorka, Hucker (HUN)
22 July 2018; 19:00	2× (yellow card) 3× (suspension)	Report	2× (yellow card) 4× (suspension)	Golovec Hall, Celje; Attendance: 2,000; Referees: Andorka, Hucker (HUN)

=== Group C ===
Pos	Team	Pld	W	D	L	GF	GA	GD	Pts	Qualification
1	Spain	3	3	0	0	96	74	+22	6	Main round
2	Croatia	3	2	0	1	92	85	+7	4	Main round
3	Poland	3	1	0	2	86	95	−9	2	Intermediate round
4	Russia	3	0	0	3	70	90	−20	0	Intermediate round

Source: EHF
Rules for classification: 1) points; 2) head-to-head points; 3) head-to-head goal difference; 4) head-to-head number of goals scored; 5) Goal difference.

19 July 2018; 13:00	Croatia	26–22	Russia	Zlatorog Arena, Celje; Attendance: 100; Referees: Manea, Iliescu (ROU)
19 July 2018; 13:00	Martinović, Vistorop 6	(14–10)	Nikolaenkov 6	Zlatorog Arena, Celje; Attendance: 100; Referees: Manea, Iliescu (ROU)
19 July 2018; 13:00	1× (yellow card) 5× (suspension)	Report	2× (yellow card) 6× (suspension)	Zlatorog Arena, Celje; Attendance: 100; Referees: Manea, Iliescu (ROU)

19 July 2018; 15:00	Spain	32–23	Poland	Zlatorog Arena, Celje; Attendance: 100; Referees: Mitrevski, Todorovski (MKD)
19 July 2018; 15:00	Sarió 7	(15–12)	Adamczyk, Mauer 6	Zlatorog Arena, Celje; Attendance: 100; Referees: Mitrevski, Todorovski (MKD)
19 July 2018; 15:00	3× (yellow card) 4× (suspension)	Report	3× (yellow card) 4× (suspension)	Zlatorog Arena, Celje; Attendance: 100; Referees: Mitrevski, Todorovski (MKD)

20 July 2018; 13:00	Poland	27–35	Croatia	Zlatorog Arena, Celje; Attendance: 100; Referees: Vitaku, Vitaku (KOS)
20 July 2018; 13:00	Mauer 6	(14–17)	Šarac 10	Zlatorog Arena, Celje; Attendance: 100; Referees: Vitaku, Vitaku (KOS)
20 July 2018; 13:00	3× (yellow card) 7× (suspension)	Report	3× (yellow card) 4× (suspension)	Zlatorog Arena, Celje; Attendance: 100; Referees: Vitaku, Vitaku (KOS)

20 July 2018; 15:00	Russia	20–28	Spain	Zlatorog Arena, Celje; Attendance: 100; Referees: Backović, Palačković (SLO)
20 July 2018; 15:00	Beliaev 7	(9–11)	Valera 5	Zlatorog Arena, Celje; Attendance: 100; Referees: Backović, Palačković (SLO)
20 July 2018; 15:00	2× (yellow card) 5× (suspension)	Report	3× (yellow card) 5× (suspension)	Zlatorog Arena, Celje; Attendance: 100; Referees: Backović, Palačković (SLO)

22 July 2018; 13:00	Croatia	31–36	Spain	Zlatorog Arena, Celje; Attendance: 150; Referees: Tzaferopoulos, Bethmann (GRE)
22 July 2018; 13:00	Šarac 6	(12–20)	Valera 8	Zlatorog Arena, Celje; Attendance: 150; Referees: Tzaferopoulos, Bethmann (GRE)
22 July 2018; 13:00	3× (yellow card) 6× (suspension)	Report	2× (yellow card) 2× (suspension) 1× (red card)	Zlatorog Arena, Celje; Attendance: 150; Referees: Tzaferopoulos, Bethmann (GRE)

22 July 2018; 15:00	Russia	28–36	Poland	Zlatorog Arena, Celje; Attendance: 100; Referees: Konjičanin, Konjičanin (BIH)
22 July 2018; 15:00	Dolinin 8	(9–19)	Zarzycki 7	Zlatorog Arena, Celje; Attendance: 100; Referees: Konjičanin, Konjičanin (BIH)
22 July 2018; 15:00	1× (yellow card) 8× (suspension)	Report	3× (yellow card) 6× (suspension)	Zlatorog Arena, Celje; Attendance: 100; Referees: Konjičanin, Konjičanin (BIH)

=== Group D ===
Pos	Team	Pld	W	D	L	GF	GA	GD	Pts	Qualification
1	Portugal	3	3	0	0	94	87	+7	6	Main round
2	France	3	2	0	1	93	85	+8	4	Main round
3	Denmark	3	1	0	2	82	84	−2	2	Intermediate round
4	Hungary	3	0	0	3	75	88	−13	0	Intermediate round

Source: EHF
Rules for classification: 1) points; 2) head-to-head points; 3) head-to-head goal difference; 4) head-to-head number of goals scored; 5) Goal difference.

19 July 2018; 17:00	France	28–32	Portugal	Zlatorog Arena, Celje; Attendance: 100; Referees: Panayides, Andreou (CYP)
19 July 2018; 17:00	Nahi 7	(14–12)	D. Silva 12	Zlatorog Arena, Celje; Attendance: 100; Referees: Panayides, Andreou (CYP)
19 July 2018; 17:00	3× (yellow card) 5× (suspension)	Report	3× (yellow card) 5× (suspension)	Zlatorog Arena, Celje; Attendance: 100; Referees: Panayides, Andreou (CYP)

19 July 2018; 19:00	Denmark	23–22	Hungary	Zlatorog Arena, Celje; Attendance: 250; Referees: Vešović, Mitrović (MNE)
19 July 2018; 19:00	Gidsel 7	(10–14)	Máthé 10	Zlatorog Arena, Celje; Attendance: 250; Referees: Vešović, Mitrović (MNE)
19 July 2018; 19:00	3× (yellow card) 4× (suspension)	Report	3× (yellow card) 6× (suspension) 1× (red card)	Zlatorog Arena, Celje; Attendance: 250; Referees: Vešović, Mitrović (MNE)

20 July 2018; 17:00	Hungary	23–34	France	Zlatorog Arena, Celje; Attendance: 200; Referees: Konjičanin, Konjičanin (BIH)
20 July 2018; 17:00	Borzas 6	(10–17)	Prandi 7	Zlatorog Arena, Celje; Attendance: 200; Referees: Konjičanin, Konjičanin (BIH)
20 July 2018; 17:00	2× (yellow card) 5× (suspension)	Report	3× (suspension)	Zlatorog Arena, Celje; Attendance: 200; Referees: Konjičanin, Konjičanin (BIH)

20 July 2018; 19:00	Portugal	31–29	Denmark	Zlatorog Arena, Celje; Attendance: 200; Referees: Manea, Iliescu (ROU)
20 July 2018; 19:00	D. Silva 9	(14–11)	Møller 8	Zlatorog Arena, Celje; Attendance: 200; Referees: Manea, Iliescu (ROU)
20 July 2018; 19:00	2× (yellow card) 5× (suspension)	Report	1× (yellow card) 3× (suspension)	Zlatorog Arena, Celje; Attendance: 200; Referees: Manea, Iliescu (ROU)

22 July 2018; 17:00	France	31–30	Denmark	Zlatorog Arena, Celje; Attendance: 200; Referees: Mitrevski, Todorovski (MKD)
22 July 2018; 17:00	Nahi, Villeminot 7	(16–14)	Jörgensen 6	Zlatorog Arena, Celje; Attendance: 200; Referees: Mitrevski, Todorovski (MKD)
22 July 2018; 17:00	3× (yellow card) 3× (suspension)	Report	4× (yellow card) 2× (suspension)	Zlatorog Arena, Celje; Attendance: 200; Referees: Mitrevski, Todorovski (MKD)

22 July 2018; 19:00	Portugal	31–30	Hungary	Zlatorog Arena, Celje; Attendance: 150; Referees: Backović, Palačković (SLO)
22 July 2018; 19:00	D. Silva 7	(12–13)	Máthé 9	Zlatorog Arena, Celje; Attendance: 150; Referees: Backović, Palačković (SLO)
22 July 2018; 19:00	3× (yellow card) 2× (suspension)	Report	2× (yellow card) 3× (suspension)	Zlatorog Arena, Celje; Attendance: 150; Referees: Backović, Palačković (SLO)

== Intermediate round ==
=== Group I1 ===
Pos	Team	Pld	W	D	L	GF	GA	GD	Pts	Qualification
1	Norway	3	2	0	1	77	71	+6	4 (Note: Norway 2 Pts, +2 GD; Sweden 2 Pts, 0 GD; Israel 2 Pts, –2 GD)	9–12th place semifinals
2	Sweden	3	2	0	1	85	76	+9	4	9–12th place semifinals
3	Israel	3	2	0	1	82	76	+6	4	13–16th place semifinals
4	Romania	3	0	0	3	78	99	−21	0	13–16th place semifinals

Source: EHF
Rules for classification: 1) points; 2) head-to-head points; 3) head-to-head goal difference; 4) head-to-head number of goals scored; 5) Goal difference.
Notes:

24 July 2018; 17:00	Romania	25–29	Norway	Golovec Hall, Celje; Attendance: 100; Referees: Konjičanin, Konjičanin (BIH)
24 July 2018; 17:00	Căbuț, Pop 5	(8–16)	Boilesen, Heldal 5	Golovec Hall, Celje; Attendance: 100; Referees: Konjičanin, Konjičanin (BIH)
24 July 2018; 17:00	2× (yellow card) 3× (suspension)	Report	3× (yellow card) 3× (suspension)	Golovec Hall, Celje; Attendance: 100; Referees: Konjičanin, Konjičanin (BIH)

24 July 2018; 19:00	Sweden	29–22	Israel	Golovec Hall, Celje; Attendance: 300; Referees: Backović, Palačković (SLO)
24 July 2018; 19:00	Salihi, Sunnefeldt 5	(14–9)	Cohen 6	Golovec Hall, Celje; Attendance: 300; Referees: Backović, Palačković (SLO)
24 July 2018; 19:00	1× (yellow card) 2× (suspension)	Report	2× (yellow card) 4× (suspension)	Golovec Hall, Celje; Attendance: 300; Referees: Backović, Palačković (SLO)

25 July 2018; 17:00	Norway	23–16	Sweden	Golovec Hall, Celje; Attendance: 200; Referees: Panayides, Andreou (CYP)
25 July 2018; 17:00	Rønningen 7	(12–10)	Sunnefeldt 4	Golovec Hall, Celje; Attendance: 200; Referees: Panayides, Andreou (CYP)
25 July 2018; 17:00	1× (yellow card) 8× (suspension) 1× (red card)	Report	4× (yellow card) 2× (suspension)	Golovec Hall, Celje; Attendance: 200; Referees: Panayides, Andreou (CYP)

25 July 2018; 19:00	Israel	30–22	Romania	Golovec Hall, Celje; Attendance: 200; Referees: Mitrevski, Todorovski (MKD)
25 July 2018; 19:00	Cohen 11	(17–13)	Hanțaru 9	Golovec Hall, Celje; Attendance: 200; Referees: Mitrevski, Todorovski (MKD)
25 July 2018; 19:00	2× (yellow card) 8× (suspension)	Report	2× (yellow card) 4× (suspension)	Golovec Hall, Celje; Attendance: 200; Referees: Mitrevski, Todorovski (MKD)

=== Group I2 ===
Pos	Team	Pld	W	D	L	GF	GA	GD	Pts	Qualification
1	Denmark	3	3	0	0	84	70	+14	6	9–12th place semifinals
2	Hungary	3	2	0	1	90	86	+4	4	9–12th place semifinals
3	Poland	3	1	0	2	88	90	−2	2	13–16th place semifinals
4	Russia	3	0	0	3	87	103	−16	0	13–16th place semifinals

Source: EHF
Rules for classification: 1) points; 2) head-to-head points; 3) head-to-head goal difference; 4) head-to-head number of goals scored; 5) Goal difference.

24 July 2018; 13:00	Russia	34–37	Hungary	Golovec Hall, Celje; Attendance: 50; Referees: Freitas, Carvalho (POR)
24 July 2018; 13:00	Nikolaenkov 8	(17–17)	Borzas 9	Golovec Hall, Celje; Attendance: 50; Referees: Freitas, Carvalho (POR)
24 July 2018; 13:00	7× (suspension)	Report	1× (yellow card) 5× (suspension)	Golovec Hall, Celje; Attendance: 50; Referees: Freitas, Carvalho (POR)

24 July 2018; 15:00	Poland	23–31	Denmark	Golovec Hall, Celje; Attendance: 150; Referees: Vitaku, Vitaku (KOS)
24 July 2018; 15:00	Mauer 6	(11–15)	Würtz 6	Golovec Hall, Celje; Attendance: 150; Referees: Vitaku, Vitaku (KOS)
24 July 2018; 15:00	3× (yellow card) 7× (suspension)	Report	2× (yellow card) 3× (suspension)	Golovec Hall, Celje; Attendance: 150; Referees: Vitaku, Vitaku (KOS)

25 July 2018; 13:00	Hungary	31–29	Poland	Golovec Hall, Celje; Attendance: 50; Referees: Tzaferopoulos, Bethmann (GRE)
25 July 2018; 13:00	Szita 7	(15–11)	Gregułowski, Mauer 7	Golovec Hall, Celje; Attendance: 50; Referees: Tzaferopoulos, Bethmann (GRE)
25 July 2018; 13:00	3× (yellow card) 5× (suspension)	Report	1× (yellow card) 2× (suspension)	Golovec Hall, Celje; Attendance: 50; Referees: Tzaferopoulos, Bethmann (GRE)

25 July 2018; 15:00	Denmark	30–25	Russia	Golovec Hall, Celje; Attendance: 200; Referees: Freitas, Carvalho (POR)
25 July 2018; 15:00	Tilsted 6	(15–12)	three players 4	Golovec Hall, Celje; Attendance: 200; Referees: Freitas, Carvalho (POR)
25 July 2018; 15:00	1× (yellow card) 4× (suspension)	Report	1× (yellow card) 6× (suspension)	Golovec Hall, Celje; Attendance: 200; Referees: Freitas, Carvalho (POR)

== Main round ==
=== Group M1 ===
Pos	Team	Pld	W	D	L	GF	GA	GD	Pts	Qualification
1	Germany	3	2	1	0	83	67	+16	5	Semifinals
2	Slovenia (H)	3	2	0	1	74	70	+4	4	Semifinals
3	Iceland	3	0	2	1	71	75	−4	2	5–8th place semifinals
4	Serbia	3	0	1	2	68	84	−16	1	5–8th place semifinals

Source: EHF
Rules for classification: 1) points; 2) head-to-head points; 3) head-to-head goal difference; 4) head-to-head number of goals scored; 5) Goal difference.
(H) Hosts

24 July 2018; 17:00	Iceland	25–25	Serbia	Zlatorog Arena, Celje; Attendance: 100; Referees: Manea, Iliescu (ROU)
24 July 2018; 17:00	Hauksson 6	(9–12)	Pisarić 8	Zlatorog Arena, Celje; Attendance: 100; Referees: Manea, Iliescu (ROU)
24 July 2018; 17:00	3× (yellow card) 5× (suspension)	Report	1× (yellow card) 6× (suspension)	Zlatorog Arena, Celje; Attendance: 100; Referees: Manea, Iliescu (ROU)

24 July 2018; 19:00	Germany	26–22	Slovenia	Zlatorog Arena, Celje; Attendance: 2,300; Referees: Vešović, Mitrović (MNE)
24 July 2018; 19:00	Thiele 6	(9–11)	Ocvirk 7	Zlatorog Arena, Celje; Attendance: 2,300; Referees: Vešović, Mitrović (MNE)
24 July 2018; 19:00	2× (yellow card) 2× (suspension) 1× (red card)	Report	2× (yellow card) 5× (suspension)	Zlatorog Arena, Celje; Attendance: 2,300; Referees: Vešović, Mitrović (MNE)

25 July 2018; 17:00	Serbia	20–32	Germany	Zlatorog Arena, Celje; Attendance: 200; Referees: Andorka, Hucker (HUN)
25 July 2018; 17:00	Mijatović 6	(12–14)	Backs, Witzke 6	Zlatorog Arena, Celje; Attendance: 200; Referees: Andorka, Hucker (HUN)
25 July 2018; 17:00	1× (yellow card) 6× (suspension)	Report	4× (suspension)	Zlatorog Arena, Celje; Attendance: 200; Referees: Andorka, Hucker (HUN)

25 July 2018; 19:00	Slovenia	25–21	Iceland	Zlatorog Arena, Celje; Attendance: 2,000; Referees: Konjičanin, Konjičanin (BIH)
25 July 2018; 19:00	Horžen, Ocvirk 5	(14–10)	Birgisson 6	Zlatorog Arena, Celje; Attendance: 2,000; Referees: Konjičanin, Konjičanin (BIH)
25 July 2018; 19:00	1× (yellow card) 4× (suspension)	Report	2× (yellow card) 5× (suspension)	Zlatorog Arena, Celje; Attendance: 2,000; Referees: Konjičanin, Konjičanin (BIH)

=== Group M2 ===
Pos	Team	Pld	W	D	L	GF	GA	GD	Pts	Qualification
1	Portugal	3	2	0	1	84	85	−1	4 (Note: Portugal 32–28 France)	Semifinals
2	France	3	2	0	1	100	93	+7	4	Semifinals
3	Spain	3	1	0	2	96	95	+1	2 (Note: Spain 36–31 Croatia)	5–8th place semifinals
4	Croatia	3	1	0	2	89	96	−7	2	5–8th place semifinals

Source: EHF
Rules for classification: 1) points; 2) head-to-head points; 3) head-to-head goal difference; 4) head-to-head number of goals scored; 5) Goal difference.
Notes:

24 July 2018; 13:00	Croatia	28–37	France	Zlatorog Arena, Celje; Attendance: 100; Referees: Andorka, Hucker (HUN)
24 July 2018; 13:00	Martinović 8	(14–18)	Villeminot 7	Zlatorog Arena, Celje; Attendance: 100; Referees: Andorka, Hucker (HUN)
24 July 2018; 13:00	6× (suspension)	Report	2× (suspension) 1× (red card)	Zlatorog Arena, Celje; Attendance: 100; Referees: Andorka, Hucker (HUN)

24 July 2018; 15:00	Spain	27–29	Portugal	Zlatorog Arena, Celje; Attendance: 250; Referees: Mitrevski, Todorovski (MKD)
24 July 2018; 15:00	four players 4	(9–13)	D. Silva 8	Zlatorog Arena, Celje; Attendance: 250; Referees: Mitrevski, Todorovski (MKD)
24 July 2018; 15:00	3× (yellow card) 4× (suspension)	Report	3× (yellow card) 2× (suspension)	Zlatorog Arena, Celje; Attendance: 250; Referees: Mitrevski, Todorovski (MKD)

25 July 2018; 13:00	France	35–33	Spain	Zlatorog Arena, Celje; Attendance: 100; Referees: Vešović, Mitrović (MNE)
25 July 2018; 13:00	Prandi 7	(19–15)	Tarrafeta 9	Zlatorog Arena, Celje; Attendance: 100; Referees: Vešović, Mitrović (MNE)
25 July 2018; 13:00	3× (yellow card) 4× (suspension)	Report	2× (yellow card) 2× (suspension)	Zlatorog Arena, Celje; Attendance: 100; Referees: Vešović, Mitrović (MNE)

25 July 2018; 15:00	Portugal	23–30	Croatia	Zlatorog Arena, Celje; Attendance: 150; Referees: Manea, Iliescu (ROU)
25 July 2018; 15:00	D. Silva 8	(11–17)	Miličević 6	Zlatorog Arena, Celje; Attendance: 150; Referees: Manea, Iliescu (ROU)
25 July 2018; 15:00	2× (yellow card) 1× (suspension)	Report	2× (yellow card) 2× (suspension)	Zlatorog Arena, Celje; Attendance: 150; Referees: Manea, Iliescu (ROU)

== Final round ==
=== Bracket ===
Championship bracket

Semifinals
27 July
Germany	26
France	28
27 July
Portugal	25
Slovenia	27

Final
29 July
France	30
Slovenia	31
Third place
29 July
Germany	29
Portugal	26

9th place bracket

9–12th place semifinals
27 July
Norway	29
Hungary	23
27 July
Denmark	30
Sweden	33

9th place
28 July
Norway	24
Sweden	20
11th place
28 July
Hungary	31
Denmark	29

5th place bracket

5–8th place semifinals
27 July
Iceland	27
Croatia	31
27 July
Spain	27
Serbia	24

5th place
29 July
Croatia	26
Spain	27
7th place
29 July
Iceland	30
Serbia	27

13th place bracket

13–16th place semifinals
27 July
Israel	26
Russia	19
27 July
Poland	31
Romania (OT)	32

13th place
28 July
Israel	30
Romania	28
15th place
28 July
Russia	28
Poland	26

=== 13–16th place semifinals ===
27 July 2018; 12:00	Israel	26–19	Russia	Golovec Hall, Celje; Attendance: 100; Referees: Vitaku, Vitaku (KOS)
27 July 2018; 12:00	Cohen 8	(12–10)	Beliaev 5	Golovec Hall, Celje; Attendance: 100; Referees: Vitaku, Vitaku (KOS)
27 July 2018; 12:00	3× (yellow card) 5× (suspension)	Report	3× (yellow card) 2× (suspension)	Golovec Hall, Celje; Attendance: 100; Referees: Vitaku, Vitaku (KOS)

27 July 2018
14:30
Poland
31–32 (ET)
Romania
Golovec Hall, Celje
Attendance: 50
Referees: Panayides, Andreou (CYP)
Jarosiewicz 7
(14–11)
Căbuț 12
3× (yellow card) 5× (suspension)
Report
4× (yellow card) 4× (suspension)

FT: 28–28 ET: 3–4

=== 9–12th place semifinals ===
27 July 2018; 17:00	Norway	29–23	Hungary	Golovec Hall, Celje; Attendance: 100; Referees: Backović, Palačković (SLO)
27 July 2018; 17:00	Boilesen 5	(12–8)	Máthé 6	Golovec Hall, Celje; Attendance: 100; Referees: Backović, Palačković (SLO)
27 July 2018; 17:00	2× (yellow card) 6× (suspension)	Report	1× (yellow card) 2× (suspension)	Golovec Hall, Celje; Attendance: 100; Referees: Backović, Palačković (SLO)

27 July 2018; 19:30	Denmark	30–33	Sweden	Golovec Hall, Celje; Attendance: 150; Referees: Manea, Iliescu (ROU)
27 July 2018; 19:30	Møller 11	(17–18)	Windahl 7	Golovec Hall, Celje; Attendance: 150; Referees: Manea, Iliescu (ROU)
27 July 2018; 19:30	1× (yellow card) 2× (suspension)	Report	3× (yellow card) 7× (suspension)	Golovec Hall, Celje; Attendance: 150; Referees: Manea, Iliescu (ROU)

=== 5–8th place semifinals ===
27 July 2018; 12:00	Iceland	27–31	Croatia	Zlatorog Arena, Celje; Attendance: 100; Referees: Freitas, Carvalho (POR)
27 July 2018; 12:00	Jóhannsson 6	(16–17)	Martinović 8	Zlatorog Arena, Celje; Attendance: 100; Referees: Freitas, Carvalho (POR)
27 July 2018; 12:00	2× (yellow card) 4× (suspension)	Report	2× (yellow card) 4× (suspension) 1× (red card)	Zlatorog Arena, Celje; Attendance: 100; Referees: Freitas, Carvalho (POR)

27 July 2018; 14:30	Spain	27–24	Serbia	Zlatorog Arena, Celje; Attendance: 100; Referees: Tzaferopoulos, Bethmann (GRE)
27 July 2018; 14:30	Martínez 5	(14–10)	Ivanović 9	Zlatorog Arena, Celje; Attendance: 100; Referees: Tzaferopoulos, Bethmann (GRE)
27 July 2018; 14:30	3× (yellow card) 3× (suspension)	Report	3× (yellow card) 2× (suspension)	Zlatorog Arena, Celje; Attendance: 100; Referees: Tzaferopoulos, Bethmann (GRE)

=== Semifinals ===
27 July 2018; 17:00	Germany	26–28	France	Zlatorog Arena, Celje; Attendance: 200; Referees: Andorka, Hucker (HUN)
27 July 2018; 17:00	Schreiber 6	(11–15)	Kempf, Villeminot 5	Zlatorog Arena, Celje; Attendance: 200; Referees: Andorka, Hucker (HUN)
27 July 2018; 17:00	2× (yellow card) 4× (suspension)	Report	4× (suspension)	Zlatorog Arena, Celje; Attendance: 200; Referees: Andorka, Hucker (HUN)

27 July 2018; 19:30	Portugal	25–27	Slovenia	Zlatorog Arena, Celje; Attendance: 3,000; Referees: Vešović, Mitrović (MNE)
27 July 2018; 19:30	Frade, D. Silva 6	(15–14)	Novak 7	Zlatorog Arena, Celje; Attendance: 3,000; Referees: Vešović, Mitrović (MNE)
27 July 2018; 19:30	5× (yellow card) 3× (suspension)	Report	4× (yellow card) 4× (suspension)	Zlatorog Arena, Celje; Attendance: 3,000; Referees: Vešović, Mitrović (MNE)

=== 15th place game ===
28 July 2018; 12:00	Russia	28–26	Poland	Golovec Hall, Celje; Attendance: 50; Referees: Backović, Palačković (SLO)
28 July 2018; 12:00	Shalabanov 10	(12–11)	Krysiak 6	Golovec Hall, Celje; Attendance: 50; Referees: Backović, Palačković (SLO)
28 July 2018; 12:00	2× (yellow card) 4× (suspension)	Report	2× (yellow card) 5× (suspension)	Golovec Hall, Celje; Attendance: 50; Referees: Backović, Palačković (SLO)

=== 13th place game ===
28 July 2018; 14:30	Israel	30–28	Romania	Golovec Hall, Celje; Attendance: 150; Referees: Panayides, Andreou (CYP)
28 July 2018; 14:30	Surkis 6	(15–13)	Hanțaru 6	Golovec Hall, Celje; Attendance: 150; Referees: Panayides, Andreou (CYP)
28 July 2018; 14:30	3× (yellow card) 4× (suspension)	Report	2× (yellow card) 2× (suspension)	Golovec Hall, Celje; Attendance: 150; Referees: Panayides, Andreou (CYP)

=== Eleventh place game ===
28 July 2018; 17:00	Hungary	31–29	Denmark	Golovec Hall, Celje; Attendance: 200; Referees: Mitrevski, Todorovski (MKD)
28 July 2018; 17:00	Máthé 11	(15–16)	Møller 8	Golovec Hall, Celje; Attendance: 200; Referees: Mitrevski, Todorovski (MKD)
28 July 2018; 17:00	2× (yellow card) 4× (suspension)	Report	3× (yellow card) 3× (suspension)	Golovec Hall, Celje; Attendance: 200; Referees: Mitrevski, Todorovski (MKD)

=== Ninth place game ===
28 July 2018; 19:30	Norway	24–20	Sweden	Golovec Hall, Celje; Attendance: 100; Referees: Vitaku, Vitaku (KOS)
28 July 2018; 19:30	Heldal 5	(16–6)	Jurmala, Salihi 5	Golovec Hall, Celje; Attendance: 100; Referees: Vitaku, Vitaku (KOS)
28 July 2018; 19:30	4× (yellow card) 7× (suspension)	Report	3× (yellow card) 5× (suspension)	Golovec Hall, Celje; Attendance: 100; Referees: Vitaku, Vitaku (KOS)

=== Seventh place game ===
29 July 2018; 10:00	Iceland	30–27	Serbia	Zlatorog Arena, Celje; Attendance: 150; Referees: Freitas, Carvalho (POR)
29 July 2018; 10:00	Hauksson 9	(13–12)	Maksić 8	Zlatorog Arena, Celje; Attendance: 150; Referees: Freitas, Carvalho (POR)
29 July 2018; 10:00	3× (yellow card) 4× (suspension)	Report	1× (yellow card) 1× (suspension)	Zlatorog Arena, Celje; Attendance: 150; Referees: Freitas, Carvalho (POR)

=== Fifth place game ===
29 July 2018; 12:30	Croatia	26–27	Spain	Zlatorog Arena, Celje; Attendance: 100; Referees: Manea, Iliescu (ROU)
29 July 2018; 12:30	Šarac 8	(12–13)	Pérez, Tarrafeta 5	Zlatorog Arena, Celje; Attendance: 100; Referees: Manea, Iliescu (ROU)
29 July 2018; 12:30	3× (yellow card) 3× (suspension)	Report	2× (yellow card) 3× (suspension)	Zlatorog Arena, Celje; Attendance: 100; Referees: Manea, Iliescu (ROU)

=== Third place game ===
29 July 2018; 15:00	Germany	29–26	Portugal	Zlatorog Arena, Celje; Attendance: 600; Referees: Mitrevski, Todorovski (MKD)
29 July 2018; 15:00	Klein 6	(14–11)	D. Silva 6	Zlatorog Arena, Celje; Attendance: 600; Referees: Mitrevski, Todorovski (MKD)
29 July 2018; 15:00	2× (yellow card) 3× (suspension)	Report	3× (yellow card) 2× (suspension)	Zlatorog Arena, Celje; Attendance: 600; Referees: Mitrevski, Todorovski (MKD)

=== Final ===
29 July 2018; 17:30	France	30–31	Slovenia	Zlatorog Arena, Celje; Attendance: 5,000; Referees: Konjičanin, Konjičanin (BIH)
29 July 2018; 17:30	Villeminot 6	(16–15)	Ocvirk 11	Zlatorog Arena, Celje; Attendance: 5,000; Referees: Konjičanin, Konjičanin (BIH)
29 July 2018; 17:30	2× (yellow card) 2× (suspension)	Report	3× (yellow card) 4× (suspension)	Zlatorog Arena, Celje; Attendance: 5,000; Referees: Konjičanin, Konjičanin (BIH)

== Final ranking ==
Rank	Team
1st place, gold medalist(s)	Slovenia
2nd place, silver medalist(s)	France
3rd place, bronze medalist(s)	Germany
4	Portugal
5	Spain
6	Croatia
7	Iceland
8	Serbia
9	Norway
10	Sweden
11	Hungary
12	Denmark
13	Israel
14	Romania
15	Russia
16	Poland

Team qualified to the 2019 Men's Junior World Handball Championship

== Awards ==
Award	Player
Most Valuable Player	Diogo Silva (POR)
Best Defence Player	Joshua Thiele (GER)
Topscorer	Gregor Ocvirk (SLO) (57 goals)

All-Star Team

Position	Player
Goalkeeper	Robin Paulsen Haug (NOR)
Right wing	Domen Novak (SLO)
Right back	Diogo Silva (POR)
Centre back	Kyllian Villeminot (FRA)
Left back	Gregor Ocvirk (SLO)
Left wing	Dylan Nahi (FRA)
Pivot	Luis Frade (POR)
