= Czechoslovakia men's national junior handball team =

Czechoslovakia

Information
- Association: Czechoslovak Handball Federation

Colours
1st	2nd

Results

IHF U-21 World Championship
- Appearances: 7 (First in 1977)
- Best result: (bronze) Third place (1981)
- Last updated on Unknown.

The Czechoslovakia national junior handball team is the national under-20 handball team of Czechoslovakia. Controlled by the Czechoslovak Handball Federation, it represents Czechoslovakia in international matches.

== Statistics ==
=== IHF Junior World Championship record ===
Champions Runners up Third place Fourth place

Year	Round	Position	GP	W	D	L	GS	GA	GD
1977 (Sweden)		10th place							
1979 (Denmark) (Sweden)		5th place							
1981 (Portugal)	Semi-Finals	3rd place							
1983 (Finland)		7th place							
1985 (Italy)		6th place							
1987 (Socialist Federal Republic of Yugoslavia)		11th place							
1989 (Spain)		13th place							
1991 (Greece)	Didn't Qualify								
Total	7/8	0 Titles							
