= Yugoslavia men's national junior handball team =

Under 20 handball team

Yugoslavia

Information
- Association: Yugoslav Handball Federation

Colours
1st	2nd

Results

IHF U-21 World Championship
- Appearances: 8 (First in 1977)
- Best result: (gold) Champions (1981, 1987, 1991)
- Last updated on Unknown.

The Yugoslavia national junior handball team is the national under–20 handball team of Yugoslavia. Controlled by the Yugoslav Handball Federation, it represents Yugoslavia in international matches.

== Statistics ==
=== IHF Junior World Championship record ===
Champions Runners up Third place Fourth place

Year	Round	Position	GP	W	D	L	GS	GA	GD
1977 (Sweden)	Semi-Finals	3rd place							
1979 (Denmark) (Sweden)	Final	2nd place							
1981 (Portugal)	Final	1st place							
1983 (Finland)		5th place							
1985 (Italy)	Semi-Finals	3rd place							
1987 (Socialist Federal Republic of Yugoslavia)	Final	1st place							
1989 (Spain)	Semi-Finals	3rd place							
1991 (Greece)	Final	1st place							
Total	8/8	3 Titles							

== Coaches ==
- Abas Arslanagić : at least at 1981 World Championship

== See also ==
- Yugoslavia men's national handball team
- Yugoslavia women's national junior handball team
