= Iceland men's national junior handball team =

Iceland

Information
- Association: Icelandic Handball Association

Colours
| 1st | 2nd |

Results

IHF U-21 World Championship
- Appearances: 13 (First in 1979)
- Best result: (bronze) Third place (1993, 2023)

European Junior Championship
- Appearances: 7 (First in 2004)
- Best result: 7th place (2018, 2024)
- Last updated on Unknown.

The Iceland national junior handball team is the national under-21 handball team of Iceland. Controlled by the Icelandic Handball Association, it represents Iceland in international matches. In 1993, the team achieved their best performance when they finished third in the 1993 Men's Junior World Handball Championship. 30 years later, 2023, they got another bronze.

== Statistics ==
=== IHF Junior World Championship record ===
Champions Runners up Third place Fourth place

| Year | Round | Position | GP | W | D | L | GS | GA | GD |
|---|---|---|---|---|---|---|---|---|---|
| 1977 (Sweden) | Didn't Qualify | | | | | | | | |
| 1979 (Denmark) (Sweden) | | 7th place | | | | | | | |
| 1981 (Portugal) | | 6th place | | | | | | | |
| 1983 (Finland) | Didn't Qualify | | | | | | | | |
| 1985 (Italy) | | 8th place | | | | | | | |
| 1987 (Socialist Federal Republic of Yugoslavia) | | 16th place | | | | | | | |
| 1989 (Spain) | | 5th place | | | | | | | |
| 1991 (Greece) | | 5th place | | | | | | | |
| 1993 (Egypt) | | 3rd place | | | | | | | |
| 1995 (Argentina) | Didn't Qualify | | | | | | | | |
| 1997 (Turkey) | Didn't Qualify | | | | | | | | |
| 1999 (Qatar) | Didn't Qualify | | | | | | | | |
| 2001 (Switzerland) | Didn't Qualify | | | | | | | | |
| 2003 (Brazil) | Didn't Qualify | | | | | | | | |
| 2005 (Hungary) | | 9th place | | | | | | | |
| 2007 (North Macedonia) | Didn't Qualify | | | | | | | | |
| 2009 (Egypt) | | 13th place | | | | | | | |
| 2011 (Greece) | Didn't Qualify | | | | | | | | |
| 2013 (Bosnia and Herzegovina) | Didn't Qualify | | | | | | | | |
| 2015 (Brazil) | Didn't Qualify | | | | | | | | |
| 2017 (Algeria) | | 12th place | | | | | | | |
| 2019 (Spain) | | 14th place | | | | | | | |
| 2023 (Germany) (Greece) | | 3rd place | | | | | | | |
| 2025 (Poland) | | 18th place | | | | | | | |
| Total | 13/24 | 0 Titles | | | | | | | |

=== EHF European Junior Championship ===
Champions Runners up Third place Fourth place

European Junior Championship record
| Year | Round | Position | GP | W | D | L | GS | GA | GD |
|---|---|---|---|---|---|---|---|---|---|
| (Romania) 1996 | Didn't Qualify | | | | | | | | |
| (Austria) 1998 | Didn't Qualify | | | | | | | | |
| (Greece) 2000 | Didn't Qualify | | | | | | | | |
| (Poland) 2002 | Didn't Qualify | | | | | | | | |
| (Latvia) 2004 | | 13th place | | | | | | | |
| (Austria) 2006 | Didn't Qualify | | | | | | | | |
| (Romania) 2008 | Didn't Qualify | | | | | | | | |
| (Slovakia) 2010 | | 8th place | | | | | | | |
| (Turkey) 2012 | | 11th place | | | | | | | |
| (Austria) 2014 | Didn't Qualify | | | | | | | | |
| (Denmark) 2016 | Didn't Qualify | | | | | | | | |
| (Slovenia) 2018 | Main round | 7th place | | | | | | | |
| (Portugal) 2022 | Intermediate round | 11th place | | | | | | | |
| (Slovenia) 2024 | Main round | 7th place | | | | | | | |
| (Romania) 2026 | Main round | 13th place | | | | | | | |
| Total | 7/15 | 0 Titles | | | | | | | |
