= 1981 Men's Junior World Handball Championship =

Tournament details
- Dates: 4–13 December
- Teams: 16 (from 3 confederations)

Final positions
- Champions: Yugoslavia (1st title)
- Runner-up: Soviet Union
- Third place: Czechoslovakia
- Fourth place: Sweden

Tournament statistics
- Matches played: 48
- Goals scored: 2,127 (44.31 per match)

The 1981 Men's Junior World Handball Championship was the third edition of the IHF Men's Junior World Championship, held in Portugal from 4 to 13 December 1981.

== Preliminary round ==
=== Group A ===
Pos	Team	Pld	W	D	L	GF	GA	GD	Pts	Qualification
1	Yugoslavia	3	3	0	0	78	51	+27	6	1st–8th place classification
2	East Germany	3	2	0	1	81	72	+9	4	1st–8th place classification
3	Switzerland	3	1	0	2	72	65	+7	2	9–16th place classification
4	Japan	3	0	0	3	58	101	−43	0	9–16th place classification

Source: Todor66
Rules for classification: 1) points; 2) goal difference; 3) goals scored; 4) head-to-head points; 5) head-to-head goal difference; 6) head-to-head number of goals scored.

1981	Yugoslavia	23–16	Switzerland

1981	East Germany	38–24	Japan

1981	Yugoslavia	30–16	Japan

1981	East Germany	24–23	Switzerland

1981	Yugoslavia	25–19	East Germany

1981	Switzerland	33–18	Japan

=== Group B ===
Pos	Team	Pld	W	D	L	GF	GA	GD	Pts	Qualification
1	Czechoslovakia	3	2	0	1	79	60	+19	4	1st–8th place classification
2	Denmark	3	2	0	1	66	52	+14	4	1st–8th place classification
3	Spain	3	2	0	1	70	66	+4	4	9–16th place classification
4	Nigeria	3	0	0	3	60	97	−37	0	9–16th place classification

Source: Todor66
Rules for classification: 1) points; 2) goal difference; 3) goals scored; 4) head-to-head points; 5) head-to-head goal difference; 6) head-to-head number of goals scored.

1981	Czechoslovakia	35–25	Nigeria

1981	Spain	20–19	Denmark

1981	Denmark	29–17	Nigeria

1981	Czechoslovakia	29–17	Spain

1981	Denmark	18–15	Czechoslovakia

1981	Spain	33–18	Nigeria

=== Group C ===
Pos	Team	Pld	W	D	L	GF	GA	GD	Pts	Qualification
1	Soviet Union	3	3	0	0	85	44	+41	6	1st–8th place classification
2	Iceland	3	2	0	1	61	65	−4	4	1st–8th place classification
3	Netherlands	3	1	0	2	58	55	+3	2	9–16th place classification
4	Portugal (H)	3	0	0	3	51	91	−40	0	9–16th place classification

Source: Todor66
Rules for classification: 1) points; 2) goal difference; 3) goals scored; 4) head-to-head points; 5) head-to-head goal difference; 6) head-to-head number of goals scored.
(H) Hosts

1981	Netherlands	20–15	Portugal

1981	Soviet Union	23–12	Iceland

1981	Soviet Union	22–21	Netherlands

1981	Iceland	31–25	Portugal

1981	Soviet Union	40–11	Portugal

1981	Iceland	18–17	Netherlands

=== Group D ===
Pos	Team	Pld	W	D	L	GF	GA	GD	Pts	Qualification
1	Sweden	3	2	0	1	50	44	+6	4	1st–8th place classification
2	France	3	1	1	1	50	51	−1	3	1st–8th place classification
3	West Germany	3	1	1	1	39	42	−3	3	9–16th place classification
4	Italy	3	1	0	2	51	53	−2	2	9–16th place classification

Source: Todor66
Rules for classification: 1) points; 2) goal difference; 3) goals scored; 4) head-to-head points; 5) head-to-head goal difference; 6) head-to-head number of goals scored.

1981	Sweden	15–10	West Germany

1981	Italy	21–19	France

1981	Sweden	20–18	Italy

1981	France	15–15	West Germany

1981	West Germany	14–12	Italy

1981	France	16–15	Sweden

== Main round ==
All points and goals against the team from the same preliminary round were carried over.

=== 9–16th place classification ===
==== Group III ====
Pos	Team	Pld	W	D	L	GF	GA	GD	Pts	Qualification
1	Spain	3	2	1	0	76	57	+19	5	Ninth place game
2	Switzerland	3	2	0	1	87	73	+14	4	Eleventh place game
3	Nigeria	3	1	0	2	70	87	−17	2	13th place game
4	Japan	3	0	1	2	57	73	−16	1	15th place game

Source: Todor66
Rules for classification: 1) points; 2) goal difference; 3) goals scored; 4) head-to-head points; 5) head-to-head goal difference; 6) head-to-head number of goals scored.

1981	Switzerland	32–29	Nigeria

1981	Spain	17–17	Japan

1981	Spain	26–22	Switzerland

1981	Nigeria	23–22	Japan

==== Group IV ====
Pos	Team	Pld	W	D	L	GF	GA	GD	Pts	Qualification
1	West Germany	3	3	0	0	62	52	+10	6	Ninth place game
2	Italy	3	2	0	1	61	56	+5	4	Eleventh place game
3	Netherlands	3	1	0	2	57	55	+2	2	13th place game
4	Portugal (H)	3	0	0	3	60	77	−17	0	15th place game

Source: Todor66
Rules for classification: 1) points; 2) goal difference; 3) goals scored; 4) head-to-head points; 5) head-to-head goal difference; 6) head-to-head number of goals scored.
(H) Hosts

1981	Italy	21–19	Netherlands

1981	West Germany	29–22	Portugal

1981	West Germany	19–18	Netherlands

1981	Italy	28–23	Portugal

=== 1st–8th place classification ===
==== Group I ====
Pos	Team	Pld	W	D	L	GF	GA	GD	Pts	Qualification
1	Yugoslavia	3	2	1	0	60	53	+7	5	Final
2	Czechoslovakia	3	1	1	1	54	56	−2	3	Third place game
3	East Germany	3	1	0	2	64	66	−2	2	Fifth place game
4	Denmark	3	1	0	2	54	57	−3	2	Seventh place game

Source: Todor66
Rules for classification: 1) points; 2) goal difference; 3) goals scored; 4) head-to-head points; 5) head-to-head goal difference; 6) head-to-head number of goals scored.

1981	Yugoslavia	19–18	Denmark

1981	Czechoslovakia	23–22	East Germany

1981	Yugoslavia	16–16	Czechoslovakia

1981	East Germany	23–18	Denmark

==== Group II ====
Pos	Team	Pld	W	D	L	GF	GA	GD	Pts	Qualification
1	Soviet Union	3	3	0	0	84	49	+35	6	Final
2	Sweden	3	1	0	2	60	64	−4	2	Third place game
3	Iceland	3	1	0	2	63	68	−5	2	Fifth place game
4	France	3	1	0	2	53	79	−26	2	Seventh place game

Source: Todor66
Rules for classification: 1) points; 2) goal difference; 3) goals scored; 4) head-to-head points; 5) head-to-head goal difference; 6) head-to-head number of goals scored.

1981	Soviet Union	35–16	France

1981	Sweden	24–22	Iceland

1981	Soviet Union	26–21	Sweden

1981	Iceland	29–21	France

== Placement games ==
=== 15th place game ===
1981	Portugal	37–34 (ET)	Japan

=== 13th place game ===
1981	Netherlands	32–24	Nigeria

=== Eleventh place game ===
1981	Switzerland	29–22	Italy

=== Ninth place game ===
1981	West Germany	20–15	Spain

=== Seventh place game ===
1981	Denmark	21–20	France

=== Fifth place game ===
1981	East Germany	23–18	Iceland

=== Third place game ===
1981	Czechoslovakia	32–26	Sweden

=== Final ===
1981	Yugoslavia	28–21	Soviet Union

== Final ranking ==
Rank	Team
Gold medal	Yugoslavia
Silver medal	Soviet Union
Bronze medal	Czechoslovakia
4	Sweden
5	East Germany
6	Iceland
7	Denmark
8	France
9	West Germany
10	Spain
11	Switzerland
12	Italy
13	Netherlands
14	Nigeria
15	Portugal
16	Japan
