= Soviet Union men's national junior handball team =

Soviet Union

Information
- Association: Soviet Union Handball Federation
- Coach: Spartak Mironovich (1970-1991)

Colours
1st	2nd

Results

IHF U-21 World Championship
- Appearances: 8 (First in 1977)
- Best result: (gold) Champions, (1977, 1979, 1983, 1985, 1989)
- Last updated on Unknown.

The Soviet Union national junior handball team was the national under–20 Handball team of the Soviet Union. It was controlled by the Soviet Union Handball Federation, it represented the Soviet Union in international matches.

== Statistics ==
=== IHF Junior World Championship record ===
Champions Runners up Third place Fourth place

Year	Round	Position	GP	W	D	L	GS	GA	GD
1977 (Sweden)	Final	Champions							
1979 (Denmark) (Sweden)	Final	Champions							
1981 (Portugal)	Final	Runners-Up							
1983 (Finland)	Final	Champions							
1985 (Italy)	Final	Champions							
1987 (Socialist Federal Republic of Yugoslavia)	Semi-Finals	Third place							
1989 (Spain)	Final	Champions							
1991 (Greece)	Semi-Finals	Third place							
Total	8/8	5 Titles							

== Coaches ==
- Spartak Mironovich (1970-1991)
