= East Germany men's national junior handball team =

East Germany

Information
- Association: East German Handball Federation

Colours
| 1st | 2nd |

Results

IHF U-21 World Championship
- Appearances: 6 (First in 1977)
- Best result: 5th place (1981, 1985)
- Last updated on Unknown.

The East Germany national junior handball team was the national under–20 handball team of East Germany. Controlled by the East German Handball Federation, it represented East Germany in international matches.

== Statistics ==
=== IHF Junior World Championship record ===
Champions Runners up Third place Fourth place

| Year | Round | Position | GP | W | D | L | GS | GA | GD |
|---|---|---|---|---|---|---|---|---|---|
| 1977 (Sweden) | | 9th place | | | | | | | |
| 1979 (Denmark) (Sweden) | | 8th place | | | | | | | |
| 1981 (Portugal) | | 5th place | | | | | | | |
| 1983 (Finland) | | 6th place | | | | | | | |
| 1985 (Italy) | | 5th place | | | | | | | |
| 1987 (Socialist Federal Republic of Yugoslavia) | | 13th place | | | | | | | |
| 1989 (Spain) | Didn't Qualify | | | | | | | | |
| 1991 (Greece) | Didn't Qualify | | | | | | | | |
| Total | 6/8 | 0 Titles | | | | | | | |
