= France men's national junior handball team =

France

Information
- Association: French Handball Federation
- Coach: Guillaume Joli

Colours
1st	2nd

Results

IHF U-21 World Championship
- Appearances: 20 (First in 1977)
- Best result: (gold) Champions (2015, 2019)

European Junior Championship
- Appearances: 13 (First in 1996)
- Best result: (silver) 2nd (2018)
- Last updated on Unknown.

The France national junior handball team is the national under–21 Handball team of France.

Controlled by the French Handball Federation, it represents France in international matches. The team competes in the IHF U21 Handball World Championship and the European U-20 Handball Championship (called the M20 EHF EURO).

The team is referred as the "U21" and "U21M".

== Achievements ==
IHF Junior World Championship:

- Winners (2): 2015 and 2019
- 3rd place (3): 1997, 2013 and 2017

European Junior Championship:

- 2nd place (1): 2018
- 3rd place (2): 2008 and 2016

== History ==
=== IHF Junior World Championship record ===
Champions Runners up Third place Fourth place

IHF Junior World Championship record
Year	Round	Position	GP	W	D	L	GS	GA	GD
1977 (Sweden)		12th place							
1979 (Denmark) / (Sweden)		9th place							
1981 (Portugal)		8th place							
1983 (Finland)		14th place							
1985 (Italy)	Didn't Qualify								
1987 (Socialist Federal Republic of Yugoslavia)		8th place							
1989 (Spain)		6th place							
1991 (Greece)		11th place							
1993 (Egypt)	Didn't Qualify								
1995 (Argentina)		8th place							
1997 (Turkey)	Semi-Finals	3rd place							
1999 (Qatar)	Semi-Finals	4th place							
2001 (Switzerland)	Didn't Qualify								
2003 (Brazil)	Didn't Qualify								
2005 (Hungary)		14th place							
2007 (North Macedonia)		7th place							
2009 (Egypt)		11th place							
2011 (Greece)		6th place							
2013 (Bosnia and Herzegovina)	Semi-Finals	3rd place							
2015 (Brazil)	Final	Champions							
2017 (Algeria)	Semi-Finals	3rd place							
2019 (Spain)	Final	Champions							
2023 (Germany) (Greece)		11th place							
2025 (Poland)		10th place	5	2	0	3	165	161	+4
Total	20/24	2 Titles							

=== EHF European Junior Championship ===
Champions Runners up Third place Fourth place

European Junior Championship record
Year	Round	Position	GP	W	D	L	GS	GA	GD
(Romania) 1996	Semi-finals	4th place							
(Austria) 1998		11th place							
(Greece) 2000	Didn't Qualify								
(Poland) 2002	Didn't Qualify								
(Latvia) 2004		10th place							
(Austria) 2006		10th place							
(Romania) 2008	Semi-finals	3rd place							
(Slovakia) 2010		6th place							
(Turkey) 2012		14th place							
(Austria) 2014		7th place							
(Denmark) 2016	Semi-finals	3rd place							
(Slovenia) 2018	Final	2nd place							
(Portugal) 2022		6th place							
(Slovenia) 2024		10th place							
(Romania) 2026		5th place							
Total	13/15	0 Titles							

== Squad ==
=== 2019 World Championship winner squad ===
Goalkeepers

- Gauthier Ivah (PSG Handball)
- Valentin Kieffer (Sélestat Alsace Handball)

Left Wingers

- Antonin Mohamed (substituted on) (US Ivry Handball)
- Gaël Tribillon (substituted off) (Fenix Toulouse Handball)
- Dylan Nahi (PSG Handball)

Right Wingers

- Edouard Kempf (PSG Handball)
- Benjamin Richert (Chambéry SMB HB)

Line players

- Robin Dourte (PSG Handball)
- Jonathan Mapu (Saint-Raphaël Var Handball)
- Tom Poyet (USAM Nîmes Gard)

Left Backs

- Nori Benhalima (substituted off) (Chambéry SMB HB)
- Axel Cochery (US Ivry Handball)
- Yoann Gibelin (US Créteil Handball)
- Elohim Prandi (substituted on) (USAM Nîmes Gard

Centre Backs

- Noah Gaudin (Cesson Rennes MHB)
- Kyllian Villeminot (Montpellier Handball)

Right Backs

- Julien Bos (Montpellier Handball)
- Clément Damiani (Chambéry SMB HB)

=== 2015 World Championship winner squad ===
Goalkeepers

- Julien Meyer (Sélestat Alsace Handball)
- Julien Salmon (HBC Nantes)

Left Wingers

- Mahamadou Keita (US Ivry Handball)
- Queido Traoré (Chambéry SMB HB)

Right Wingers

- Florian Billant (US Dunkerque Handball)
- Youenn Cardinal (US Créteil Handball)

Line players

- Johannes Marescot (Chambéry SMB HB)
- Nicolas Nieto (US Dunkerque Handball)
- Nicolas Tournat (HBC Nantes)

Left Backs

- Quentin Dupuy (USAM Nîmes Gard)
- Adama Sako (Tremblay Handball)
- Rudy Seri (Sélestat Alsace Handball)

Centre Backs

- Sébastien Joumel (US Dunkerque Handball)
- Alexandre Saïdani (Montpellier Handball)

Right Backs

- Florian Delecroix (HBC Nantes)
- Alexandre Tritta (Chambéry SMB HB)
