= 1979 Men's Junior World Handball Championship =

Tournament details
- Host countries: Denmark; Sweden
- Dates: 23 October – 2 November
- Teams: 24 (from 3 confederations)

Final positions
- Champions: Soviet Union (2nd title)
- Runners-up: Yugoslavia
- Third place: Sweden
- Fourth place: Denmark

Tournament statistics
- Matches played: 88
- Goals scored: 3,766 (42.8 per match)

The 1979 Men's Junior World Handball Championship was the second edition of the IHF Men's Junior World Championship, held in Denmark and Sweden from 23 October to 2 November 1979.

== Preliminary round ==
=== Group A ===
Pos	Team	Pld	W	D	L	GF	GA	GD	Pts	Qualification
1	Yugoslavia	5	5	0	0	141	71	+70	10	1st–8th place classification
2	East Germany	5	4	0	1	144	86	+58	8	1st–8th place classification
3	Poland	5	3	0	2	132	101	+31	6	9–16th place classification
4	Norway	5	2	0	3	111	110	+1	4	9–16th place classification
5	Italy	5	1	0	4	102	109	−7	2	17th–23rd place classification
6	Chinese Taipei	5	0	0	5	77	230	−153	0	17th–23rd place classification

Source: Todor66
Rules for classification: 1) points; 2) goal difference; 3) goals scored; 4) head-to-head points; 5) head-to-head goal difference; 6) head-to-head number of goals scored.

23 October 1979	Yugoslavia	25–13	Norway

23 October 1979	Poland	50–18	Chinese Taipei

1979	East Germany	25–16	Italy

1979	East Germany	52–13	Chinese Taipei

1979	Poland	20–17	Norway

1979	Yugoslavia	26–11	Italy

1979	Norway	20–16	Italy

1979	East Germany	21–20	Poland

1979	Yugoslavia	44–14	Chinese Taipei

1979	Poland	24–20	Italy

1979	Norway	45–18	Chinese Taipei

1979	Yugoslavia	21–15	East Germany

1979	Italy	39–14	Chinese Taipei

1979	East Germany	31–16	Norway

1979	Yugoslavia	25–18	Poland

=== Group B ===
Pos	Team	Pld	W	D	L	GF	GA	GD	Pts	Qualification
1	Denmark (H)	5	5	0	0	135	69	+66	10	1st–8th place classification
2	Hungary	5	4	0	1	134	93	+41	8	1st–8th place classification
3	France	5	3	0	2	120	101	+19	6	9–16th place classification
4	Finland	5	2	0	3	107	117	−10	4	9–16th place classification
5	Japan	5	1	0	4	95	146	−51	2	17th–23rd place classification
6	Luxembourg	5	0	0	5	79	144	−65	0	17th–23rd place classification

Source: Todor66
Rules for classification: 1) points; 2) goal difference; 3) goals scored; 4) head-to-head points; 5) head-to-head goal difference; 6) head-to-head number of goals scored.
(H) Hosts

1979	Hungary	27–22	Japan

23 October 1979	Denmark	20–13	Finland

23 October 1979	France	23–11	Luxembourg

1979	Hungary	37–15	Luxembourg

1979	Denmark	37–13	Japan

1979	France	32–16	Finland

1979	Hungary	23–17	Finland

1979	Denmark	29–21	France

1979	Japan	22–19	Luxembourg

1979	Hungary	26–20	France

1979	Luxembourg	30–11	Switzerland

1979	Finland	29–19	Japan

1979	Denmark	19–11	Hungary

1979	France	24–19	Japan

1979	Finland	32–23	Luxembourg

=== Group C ===
Pos	Team	Pld	W	D	L	GF	GA	GD	Pts	Qualification
1	Soviet Union	5	5	0	0	145	77	+68	10	1st–8th place classification
2	Iceland	5	4	0	1	121	88	+33	8	1st–8th place classification
3	West Germany	5	3	0	2	102	71	+31	6	9–16th place classification
4	Netherlands	5	2	0	3	73	103	−30	4	9–16th place classification
5	Portugal	5	1	0	4	76	123	−47	2	17th–23rd place classification
6	Saudi Arabia	5	0	0	5	62	117	−55	0	17th–23rd place classification

Source: Todor66
Rules for classification: 1) points; 2) goal difference; 3) goals scored; 4) head-to-head points; 5) head-to-head goal difference; 6) head-to-head number of goals scored.

23 October 1979	West Germany	25–8	Saudi Arabia

1979	Iceland	25–19	Portugal

1979	Soviet Union	29–13	Netherlands

1979	West Germany	20–9	Netherlands

1979	Portugal	17–16	Saudi Arabia

1979	Soviet Union	25–20	Iceland

1979	West Germany	25–10	Portugal

1979	Iceland	25–17	Netherlands

1979	Soviet Union	23–9	Saudi Arabia

1979	Iceland	16–14	West Germany

1979	Netherlands	17–16	Saudi Arabia

1979	Soviet Union	40–17	Portugal

1979	Iceland	35–13	Saudi Arabia

1979	Netherlands	17–13	Portugal

1979	Soviet Union	28–18	West Germany

=== Group D ===
Pos	Team	Pld	W	D	L	GF	GA	GD	Pts	Qualification
1	Sweden (H)	4	4	0	0	96	66	+30	8	1st–8th place classification
2	Czechoslovakia	4	3	0	1	104	63	+41	6	1st–8th place classification
3	Switzerland	4	2	0	2	66	76	−10	4	9–16th place classification
4	Israel	4	1	0	3	75	101	−26	2	9–16th place classification
5	Belgium	4	0	0	4	54	89	−35	0	17th–23rd place classification
6	United States	0	0	0	0	0	0	0	0	Withdrawn

Source: Todor66
Rules for classification: 1) points; 2) goal difference; 3) goals scored; 4) head-to-head points; 5) head-to-head goal difference; 6) head-to-head number of goals scored.
(H) Hosts

23 October 1979	Czechoslovakia	32–16	Israel

23 October 1979	Switzerland	21–10	Belgium
23 October 1979		(10–4)

1979	Czechoslovakia	22–13	Belgium

1979	Sweden	29–19	Israel

1979	Israel	24–19	Belgium

1979	Sweden	21–14	Switzerland

1979	Czechoslovakia	29–10	Switzerland

1979	Sweden	22–12	Belgium

1979	Sweden	24–21	Czechoslovakia

1979	Switzerland	21–16	Israel

== Main round ==
All points and goals against the team from the same preliminary round were carried over.

=== 17th–23rd place classification ===
==== Group V ====
Pos	Team	Pld	W	D	L	GF	GA	GD	Pts	Qualification
1	Italy	2	1	1	0	54	29	+25	3	17th place game
2	Belgium	2	1	1	0	51	34	+17	3	19th place game
3	Chinese Taipei	2	0	0	2	33	75	−42	0	21st place game

Source: Todor66
Rules for classification: 1) points; 2) goal difference; 3) goals scored; 4) head-to-head points; 5) head-to-head goal difference; 6) head-to-head number of goals scored.

1979	Belgium	36–19	Chinese Taipei

1979	Italy	15–15	Belgium

==== Group VI ====
Pos	Team	Pld	W	D	L	GF	GA	GD	Pts	Qualification
1	Portugal	3	3	0	0	66	58	+8	6	17th place game
2	Japan	3	2	0	1	65	64	+1	4	19th place game
3	Saudi Arabia	3	1	0	2	56	56	0	2	21st place game
4	Luxembourg	3	0	0	3	57	66	−9	0	

Source: Todor66
Rules for classification: 1) points; 2) goal difference; 3) goals scored; 4) head-to-head points; 5) head-to-head goal difference; 6) head-to-head number of goals scored.

1979	Portugal	22–20	Luxembourg

1979	Saudi Arabia	22–18	Luxembourg

1979	Portugal	27–22	Japan

1979	Japan	21–18	Saudi Arabia

=== 9–16th place classification ===
==== Group III ====
Pos	Team	Pld	W	D	L	GF	GA	GD	Pts	Qualification
1	Poland	3	2	1	0	66	59	+7	5	Ninth place game
2	Switzerland	3	1	1	1	58	66	−8	3	Eleventh place game
3	Norway	3	1	0	2	65	56	+9	2	13th place game
4	Israel	3	1	0	2	57	65	−8	2	15th place game

Source: Todor66
Rules for classification: 1) points; 2) goal difference; 3) goals scored; 4) head-to-head points; 5) head-to-head goal difference; 6) head-to-head number of goals scored.

1979	Poland	25–21	Israel

1979	Norway	29–16	Switzerland

1979	Israel	20–19	Norway

1979	Poland	21–21	Switzerland

==== Group IV ====
Pos	Team	Pld	W	D	L	GF	GA	GD	Pts	Qualification
1	France	3	3	0	0	78	54	+24	6	Ninth place game
2	West Germany	3	2	0	1	71	49	+22	4	Eleventh place game
3	Netherlands	3	0	1	2	44	61	−17	1	13th place game
4	Finland	3	0	1	2	51	80	−29	1	15th place game

Source: Todor66
Rules for classification: 1) points; 2) goal difference; 3) goals scored; 4) head-to-head points; 5) head-to-head goal difference; 6) head-to-head number of goals scored.

1979	France	22–16	Netherlands

1979	West Germany	29–16	Finland

1979	Netherlands	19–19	Finland

1979	France	24–22	West Germany

=== 1st–8th place classification ===
==== Group I ====
Pos	Team	Pld	W	D	L	GF	GA	GD	Pts	Qualification
1	Yugoslavia	3	3	0	0	61	47	+14	6	Final
2	Sweden (H)	3	2	0	1	59	61	−2	4	Third place game
3	Czechoslovakia	3	0	1	2	58	63	−5	1	Fifth place game
4	East Germany	3	0	1	2	54	61	−7	1	Seventh place game

Source: Todor66
Rules for classification: 1) points; 2) goal difference; 3) goals scored; 4) head-to-head points; 5) head-to-head goal difference; 6) head-to-head number of goals scored.
(H) Hosts

1979	Yugoslavia	17–15	Czechoslovakia

1979	Sweden	18–17	East Germany

1979	Yugoslavia	23–17	Sweden

1979	Czechoslovakia	22–22	East Germany

==== Group II ====
Pos	Team	Pld	W	D	L	GF	GA	GD	Pts	Qualification
1	Soviet Union	3	3	0	0	78	58	+20	6	Final
2	Denmark (H)	3	2	0	1	62	57	+5	4	Third place game
3	Hungary	3	1	0	2	45	59	−14	2	Fifth place game
4	Iceland	3	0	0	3	53	64	−11	0	Seventh place game

Source: Todor66
Rules for classification: 1) points; 2) goal difference; 3) goals scored; 4) head-to-head points; 5) head-to-head goal difference; 6) head-to-head number of goals scored.
(H) Hosts

1979	Denmark	22–19	Iceland

1979	Soviet Union	26–17	Hungary

1979	Soviet Union	27–21	Denmark

1979	Hungary	17–14	Iceland

== Placement games ==
=== 21st place game ===
1979	Chinese Taipei	23–22	Saudi Arabia

=== 19th place game ===
1979	Japan	20–19	Belgium

=== 17th place game ===
1979	Italy	26–20	Portugal

=== 15th place game ===
1979	Israel	30–27	Finland

=== 173th place game ===
1979	Norway	22–20	Netherlands

=== Eleventh place game ===
1979	West Germany	20–18	Switzerland

=== Ninth place game ===
1979	France	27–23	Poland

=== Seventh place game ===
2 November 1979	Iceland	27–24	East Germany

=== Fifth place game ===
2 November 1979	Czechoslovakia	20–19	Hungary

=== Third place game ===
2 November 1979	Sweden	25–20	Denmark

=== Final ===
2 November 1979	Soviet Union	30–25	Yugoslavia

== Final ranking ==
Rank	Team
Gold medal	Soviet Union
Silver medal	Yugoslavia
Bronze medal	Sweden
4	Denmark
5	Czechoslovakia
6	Hungary
7	Iceland
8	East Germany
9	France
10	Poland
11	West Germany
12	Switzerland
13	Norway
14	Netherlands
15	Israel
16	Finland
17	Italy
18	Portugal
19	Japan
20	Belgium
21	Chinese Taipei
22	Saudi Arabia
23	Luxembourg
WD	~~United States~~
