= Kyllian Villeminot =

Swedish handball player (born 1998)

Personal information
- Nationality: French
- Born: 20 May 1998 (age 28) Lyon, France
- Height: 1.89 m (6 ft 2 in)

Sport
- Sport: Handball
- Position: Centre back
- Current club: Montpellier Handball
- Number: 5

Youth career
- Years: Team
- –: Villeurbanne HA
- –: Montpellier Handball

Senior clubs
- Years: Team
- 2016–: Montpellier Handball
National team
Years	Team	Apps	(Gls)
2024-	France	1	(0)
Medal record
Youth European Championship
Gold medal – first place	2016 Croatia
Youth World Championship
Gold medal – first place	2017 Georgia
Junior World Championship
Gold medal – first place	2019 Spain
Junior European Championship
Silver medal – second place	2018 Slovenia
- Updated on 7 November 2024

Kyllian Villeminot (born 20 May 1998) is a French handball player for Montpellier Handball.

== Achievements ==
- EHF Champions League
  - Winner: 2018

Individual awards

- MVP at the 2016 Youth European Championship
- MVP at the 2017 Youth World Championship
- All-Star Team as best Centre back at the 2018 Junior European Championship
- All-Star Team as best Centre back at the 2019 Junior World Championship

Both of his parent, Jean-François Villeminot and Corinne Bernillon. His brother, Allan Villeminot, is also a handball player.
