= Gregor Ocvirk =

Slovenian handball player (born 1998)

Personal information
- Nationality: Slovenian
- Born: 5 December 1998 (age 27) Celje, Slovenia
- Height: 1.83 m (6 ft 0 in)

Sport
- Sport: Handball
- Position: Left back
- Current club: PLER-Budapest
- Number: 11

Youth career
- Years: Team
- 2009–2018: RK Celje

Senior clubs
- Years: Team
- –2018: RK Celje
- 2016: → RK Slovenj Gradec 2011 (loan)
- 2016–2017: → RK Jeruzalem Ormož (loan)
- 2017–2018: → RK Maribor Branik (loan)
- 2018: RK Vardar
- 2019: RK Jeruzalem Ormož
- 2019–2021: IFK Kristianstad
- 2021–2024: RK Vojvodina
- 2024: Al Ain
- 2024–: PLER-Budapest
National team
Years	Team	Apps	(Gls)
2018–	Slovenia	4	(2)
Medal record
U-20 European Championship
Gold medal – first place	2018 Slovenia

Gregor Ocvirk (born 5 December 1998) is a Slovenian handball player who plays for PLER-Budapest.

== Awards and accomplishments ==
=== Individual ===
- All-Star Team as best Left back at the 2018 Junior European Championship
- Top scorer at the 2018 Junior European Championship (57 goals)
