= IHF Men's U21 Handball World Championship =

Men's U21 handball tournament

- Upcoming season or competition: 2027 IHF Men's U21 Handball World Championship
- Sport: Handball
- Founded: 1977
- Founder: International Handball Federation
- First season: 1977
- No. of teams: 32
- Continents: 6
- Most recent champion: Denmark (4th title)
- Most titles: Soviet Union (5 titles)

The IHF Men's U21 Handball World Championship (or the IHF Men's Junior World Championship) is the official competition for men's national handball teams of under-21 years category. It is being organized by the International Handball Federation since 1977. It takes place every two years in odd years.

== Tournaments ==
Year	Host country	Gold medal game			Bronze medal game		
Year	Host country	Gold	Score	Silver	Bronze	Score	Fourth place
1977; Details	Sweden	Soviet Union	24–10	Hungary	Yugoslavia	24–21	Spain
1979; Details	Denmark/Sweden	Soviet Union	30–25	Yugoslavia	Sweden	25–20	Denmark
1981; Details	Portugal	Yugoslavia	28–21	Soviet Union	Czechoslovakia	32–26	Sweden
1983; Details	Finland	Soviet Union	32–17	West Germany	Denmark	31–28	Sweden
1985; Details	Italy	Soviet Union	32–27	Sweden	Yugoslavia	23–22	West Germany
1987; Details	(Socialist Federal Republic of Yugoslavia); Yugoslavia	Yugoslavia	28–26	Spain	Soviet Union	34–18	Sweden
1989; Details	Spain	Soviet Union	23–17	Spain	Yugoslavia	23–22	West Germany
1991; Details	Greece	Yugoslavia	27–16	Sweden	Soviet Union	27–25	Spain
1993; Details	Egypt	Egypt	22–19	Denmark	Iceland	21–20	Russia
1995; Details	Argentina	Russia	29–28; OT	Spain	Portugal	24–23	Norway
1997; Details	Turkey	Denmark	29–23	Ukraine	France	28–24	Poland
1999; Details	Qatar	Denmark	26–22; OT	Sweden	Egypt	32–31; OT	France
2001; Details	Switzerland	Russia	31–27	Spain	Sweden	37–26	Hungary
2003; Details	Brazil	Sweden	36–34; OT	Denmark	Slovenia	35–33	Spain
2005; Details	Hungary	Denmark	40–35	Serbia and Montenegro	Hungary	28–27	Germany
2007; Details	North Macedonia	Sweden	31–29	Germany	Denmark	27–26	Croatia
2009; Details	Egypt	Germany	32–24	Denmark	Slovenia	35–24	Egypt
2011; Details	Greece	Germany	27–18	Denmark	Tunisia	24–18	Egypt
2013; Details	Bosnia and Herzegovina	Sweden	28–23	Spain	France	32–27	Croatia
2015; Details	Brazil	France	26–24	Denmark	Germany	35–34; OT	Egypt
2017; Details	Algeria	Spain	39–38; OT	Denmark	France	23–22	Germany
2019; Details	Spain	France	28–23	Croatia	Egypt	37–27	Portugal
2021; Details	Hungary	Cancelled due to the COVID-19 pandemic			Cancelled due to the COVID-19 pandemic		
2023; Details	Germany/Greece	Germany	30–23	Hungary	Iceland	27–23	Serbia
2025; Details	Poland	Denmark	29–26	Portugal	Faroe Islands	27–26	Sweden
2027; Details	North Macedonia		–			–	

== Medal table ==
Rank	Nation	Gold	Silver	Bronze	Total
1	Russia	7	2	2	11
2	Denmark	4	6	2	12
3	Sweden	3	3	2	8
4	Serbia	3	2	3	8
5	Germany	3	1	1	5
6	France	2	0	3	5
7	Spain	1	5	0	6
8	Egypt	1	0	2	3
9	Hungary	0	2	1	3
10	Portugal	0	1	1	2
11	Croatia	0	1	0	1
11	Ukraine	0	1	0	1
11	West Germany	0	1	0	1
14	Iceland	0	0	2	2
14	Slovenia	0	0	2	2
16	Czechoslovakia	0	0	1	1
16	Faroe Islands	0	0	1	1
16	Tunisia	0	0	1	1
Totals (18 entries)		24	25	24	73

== Participating nations ==
Nation	(Sweden) 1977	(Denmark) (Sweden) 1979	(Portugal) 1981	(Finland) 1983	(Italy) 1985	(Socialist Federal Republic of Yugoslavia) 1987	(Spain) 1989	(Greece) 1991	(Egypt) 1993	(Argentina) 1995	(Turkey) 1997	(Qatar) 1999	(Switzerland) 2001	(Brazil) 2003	(Hungary) 2005	(North Macedonia) 2007	(Egypt) 2009	(Greece) 2011	(Bosnia and Herzegovina) 2013	(Brazil) 2015	(Algeria) 2017	(Spain) 2019	(Germany) (Greece) 2023	(Poland) 2025	(North Macedonia) 2027	Years
Algeria						12th	14th		13th				12th	18th			19th	14th	24th	20th	14th		22nd	20th		12
Angola																19th			21st	21st			26th		Q	5
Argentina									11th	17th			20th	16th	11th	13th	6th	20th	16th	13th	13th	21st	25th	23rd	Q	15
Australia																						24th	WD			1
Austria	14th			15th			11th		14th		19th													11th	Q	7
Bahrain										17th												17th	13th	28th	Q	5
Belarus											14th		13th				15th			6th						4
Belgium		20th																								1
Benin																		23rd								1
Bosnia and Herzegovina																			14th							1
Brazil								15th		17th	16th	13th	11th	8th	16th	16th	9th	11th	6th	10th	18th	12th	16th	28th	Q	17
Bulgaria																18th										1
Burkina Faso																					24th					1
Canada																		22nd						32nd		1
Chile															20th	20th		21st	23rd	23rd	23rd	20th	29th		Q	9
China								16th																		1
Chinese Taipei		21st																								1
Congo															19th				22nd							2
Costa Rica																							31st			1
Croatia											10th	11th	9th	5th		4th			4th		10th	2nd	8th	12th		10
Cuba																							28th		Q	2
Czech Republic										8th					13th		10th									3
Czechoslovakia	10th	5th	3rd	7th	6th	11th	13th																			7
Denmark	8th	4th	7th	3rd	7th	9th		7th	2nd	9th	1st	1st	6th	2nd	1st	3rd	2nd	2nd	13th	2nd	2nd	5th	5th	1st	Q	24
East Germany	9th	8th	5th	6th	5th	13th																				6
Egypt				13th	15th		15th	13th	1st	6th	6th	3rd	8th	10th	7th	6th	4th	4th	8th	4th	17th	3rd	10th	6th	Q	21
Estonia																	12th									1
Faroe Islands																					16th		7th	3rd	Q	4
Finland		16th		8th																						2
France	12th	9th	8th	14th		8th	6th	11th		7th	3rd	4th			14th	7th	11th	6th	3rd	1st	3rd	1st	11th	10th	Q	21
Germany								9th		11th	7th		5th	13th	4th	2nd	1st	1st	11th	3rd	4th	9th	1st	5th	Q	16
Greece								14th	16th	13th	18th	8th						16th					15th			7
Greenland																	18th						32nd			2
Guinea																							WD		Q	1
Hungary	2nd	6th				7th	10th	10th	6th			16th	4th	15th	3rd			17th	12th		5th	15th	2nd	14th	Q	17
Iceland		7th	6th		8th	16th	5th	5th	3rd						9th		13th				12th	14th	3rd	18th	Q	14
Iran																	17th	12th								2
Israel	17th	15th										14th			10th										Q	5
Italy		17th	12th	16th	12th																					4
Japan		19th	16th		11th															18th		18th	19th	16th		7
Kosovo																						23rd				1
Kuwait	16th			12th		15th							17th	19th	18th	12th	23rd		20th				24th			10
Libya																	24th						30th			2
Luxembourg		23rd																								1
Madagascar	20th																									1
Mexico																								31st	Q	2
Morocco	19th																22nd				22nd		23rd	22nd		5
Netherlands	15th	14th	13th														14th		5th	19th						6
New Zealand												17th														1
Nigeria			14th		16th																	19th			Q	4
North Macedonia											15th					10th					6th			25th	Q	4
Norway	18th	13th				10th			7th	4th		15th	14th				16th	10th		15th	11th	8th	18th	8th	Q	15
Paraguay																				24th						1
Poland	7th	10th		10th	14th		12th		12th	13th	4th		10th	7th									17th	19th		12
Portugal		18th	15th						10th	3rd		10th				15th	7th	9th		14th		4th	6th	2nd	Q	13
Puerto Rico														20th												1
Qatar										13th		12th	19th	12th			20th	15th	19th	9th	21st					9
Romania	11th					5th	8th	6th	8th	17th					6th					8th				15th	Q	10
Russia									4th	1st	12th	7th	1st			9th		13th	17th	16th	8th					10
Saudi Arabia		22nd									11th										20th		21st	29th	Q	6
Serbia																		18th	10th	17th		13th	4th	17th		6
Serbia and Montenegro														11th	2nd											2
Slovakia										13th				14th		14th										3
Slovenia										10th	20th		16th	3rd	8th	8th	3rd	8th	9th		9th	6th	20th	7th	Q	14
South Korea					13th	14th	9th	12th	15th						12th	11th		19th	18th	11th	19th	16th		24th	Q	14
Soviet Union	1st	1st	2nd	1st	1st	3rd	1st	3rd																		8
Spain	4th		10th	9th	10th	2nd	2nd	4th	9th	2nd	5th	6th	2nd	4th	5th	5th	8th	5th	2nd	7th	1st	10th	9th	9th	Q	24
Sweden	6th	3rd	4th	4th	2nd	4th	7th	2nd	5th	12th		2nd	3rd	1st	15th	1st	5th	7th	1st	5th	15th	11th	12th	4th	Q	24
Switzerland	13th	12th	11th	11th	9th								15th	6th					7th					13th	Q	10
Tunisia	DQ										8th	9th	18th	9th	17th	17th	21st	3rd	15th	12th	7th	7th	14th	21st	Q	16
Turkey								8th			13th															2
Ukraine											2nd			17th												2
United Arab Emirates											17th														Q	2
United States		WD					16th															22nd	27th	26th		4
Uruguay																				22nd				30th		2
Venezuela																		24th								1
West Germany	5th	11th	9th	2nd	4th	6th	4th																			7
Yugoslavia	3rd	2nd	1st	5th	3rd	1st	3rd	1st		5th	9th	5th	7th													12
Total	21	23	16	16	16	16	16	16	16	20	20	17	20	20	20	20	24	24	24	24	24	24	32	32	32	
