= Nikolaj Koch-Hansen =

Danish handball player (born 1986)

Personal information
- Full name: Nikolaj Witthøft Koch-Hansen
- Nationality: Danish (Denmark)
- Born: 11 March 1986 (age 40)
- Height: 1.94 m (6 ft 4 in)

Sport
- Sport: Handball
- Position: Left back
National team
Years	Team	Apps	(Gls)
2009-2012	Denmark	4	(4)

Nikolaj Koch-Hansen (born 11 March 1986) is a Danish former handball player. He was known to be able to play all three back positions. He has previous played for Danish Handball League sides FCK Håndbold, Ajax Heroes, Team Sydhavsøerne, Swedish club HK Malmö, and French club US Creteil.

He initially retired in 2019 while playing for Team Sydhavsøerne, but 18 months later he returned to handball to join TMS Ringsted for one additional season as they had multiple injuries.

He is the younger brother of fellow Handball player Sebastian Koch-Hansen.
