= Sebastian Koch-Hansen =

Danish handball player (born 1984)

Personal information
- Full name: Sebastian Koch-Hansen
- Nationality: Danish (Denmark)
- Born: 19 June 1984 (age 42)
- Height: 194 cm (76 in)

Sport
- Sport: Handball
- Position: Right back

Senior clubs
- Years: Team
- –: Frederiksberg IF
- ?-2009: FCK Handbold
- 2009-2010: BM Aragón
- 2010-2011: Frederiksberg IF
- 2011-?: Nordsjaelland Handbold

Sebastian Koch-Hansen (born 19 June 1984) is a Danish handball player. He is the older brother of fellow handball player Nikolaj Koch-Hansen.
