= Ayman El-Alfy =

Egyptian handball player

Personal information
- Nationality: Egyptian
- Born: 27 September 1974 (age 50)

Sport
- Sport: Handball

Ayman El-Alfy (born 27 September 1974) is an Egyptian handball player. He competed at the 1996 Summer Olympics and the 2000 Summer Olympics.
