= Wael Fahim =

Egyptian handball player

Personal information
- Nationality: Egyptian
- Born: 1 January 1976 (age 49)

Sport
- Sport: Handball

Wael Fahim (born 1 January 1976) is an Egyptian handball player. He competed in the men's tournament at the 2004 Summer Olympics.
