= Denmark men's national junior handball team =

National under-20 handball team of Denmark

Denmark

Information
- Association: Danish Handball Federation
- Coach: Ulrik Kirkely

Colours
1st	2nd

Results

IHF U-21 World Championship
- Appearances: 23 (First in 1977)
- Best result: (gold) Champions, (1997, 1999, 2005, 2025)

European Junior Championship
- Appearances: 15 (First in 1996)
- Best result: (gold) Champions, (1996, 1998, 2008, 2010)
- Last updated on Unknown.

Denmark men's national junior handball team
Medal record

Representing Denmark

Handball

World Junior Championship
Gold medal – first place	1997	
Gold medal – first place	1999	
Gold medal – first place	2005	
Gold medal – first place	2025	
Silver medal – second place	1993	
Silver medal – second place	2003	
Silver medal – second place	2009	
Silver medal – second place	2011	
Silver medal – second place	2015	
Silver medal – second place	2017	
Bronze medal – third place	2007	
Bronze medal – third place	1983	

European Junior Championship
Gold medal – first place	1996	
Gold medal – first place	1998	
Gold medal – first place	2008	
Gold medal – first place	2010	
Silver medal – second place	2004	
Bronze medal – third place	2006	
Bronze medal – third place	2024	

The Denmark national junior handball team is the national under–20 Handball team of Denmark. Controlled by the Danish Handball Federation it represents Denmark in international matches. They are the team with the most medals in both the IHF Junior World Championship with 12 medals, and the European Junior Championship with 7 medals.

== History ==
=== IHF Junior World Championship record ===
Year	Round	Position	GP	W	D	L	GS	GA	GD
Sweden 1977		8th Place	6	2	0	4	116	136	–20
Denmark/Sweden 1979		4th Place	8	6	0	2	198	140	+58
Portugal 1981		7th Place	6	3	0	3	123	114	+9
Finland 1983		Third Place	6	5	0	1	153	133	+20
Italy 1985		7th Place	7	4	0	3	175	156	+19
Yugoslavia 1987		9th Place	7	3	0	4	150	167	–17
Spain 1989	Didn't Qualify								
Greece 1991		7th Place	7	3	2	2	165	167	–2
Egypt 1993	Final Round	2nd Place	7	4	0	3	179	151	+28
Argentina 1995		9th Place	8	5	0	3	220	179	+41
Turkey 1997	Final Round	Champions	8	8	0	0	231	154	+77
Qatar 1999	Final Round	Champions	8	8	0	0	212	144	+68
Switzerland 2001		6th Place	8	5	0	3	200	165	+35
Brazil 2003	Final Round	2nd Place	9	6	0	3	265	243	+22
Hungary 2005	Final Round	Champions	9	8	0	1	302	256	+46
Macedonia 2007	Semi Finals	Third Place	9	7	0	2	274	255	+19
Egypt 2009	Final Round	2nd Place	10	9	0	1	326	250	+76
Greece 2011	Final Round	2nd Place	9	8	0	1	276	204	+72
Bosnia and Herzegovina 2013	Round of 16	13th Place	9	6	1	2	275	238	+37
2015 Brazil	Final Round	2nd Place	9	7	0	2	273	225	+48
2017 Algeria	Final Round	2nd Place	9	6	0	3	294	265	+29
Spain 2019	Quarterfinals	5th Place	9	7	0	2	329	252	+77
Germany/Greece 2023	Quarterfinals	5th Place	8	6	0	2	231	210	+21
Poland 2025	Final Round	Champions	9	9	0	0	333	261	+72
Total	23/24	4 Titles							

=== European Junior Championship record ===
Year	Round	Position	GP	W	D	L	GS	GA	GD
Romania 1996	Final Round	Champions							
Austria 1998	Final Round	Champions							
Greece 2000	Semi Finals	4th Place							
Poland 2002		5th Place							
Latvia 2004	Final Round	2nd Place							
Austria 2006	Semi Finals	Third Place							
Romania 2008	Final Round	Champions							
Slovakia 2010	Final Round	Champions							
Turkey 2012		10th place							
Austria 2014	Semi Finals	4th Place							
Denmark 2016	Main round	6th Place							
Slovenia 2018	Intermediate round	12th Place							
Portugal 2022	Main round	8th place							
Slovenia 2024	Semi Finals	3rd place							
Romania 2026	Semi Finals	4th place							
Total	15/15	4 Titles							

== Team ==
=== Current squad ===
This is the squad for the 2015 Men's Junior World Handball Championship

Denmark national junior handball team roster
No.	Pos.	Player name	Date of birth	Height	Weight	Current Club
12	GK	Kristian Pedersen	7 February 1995	1.91 m (6 ft 3 in)	90 kg (200 lb)	(Denmark) Nordsjælland Håndbold
20	GK	Mike Jensen	7 February 1995	2.05 m (6 ft 9 in)	104 kg (229 lb)	(Denmark) GOG Gudme
04	RB	Arewth Jacob Lassen	11 September 1995	1.96 m (6 ft 5 in)	110 kg (240 lb)	(Denmark) Randers HH
13	RB	Jóhan Hansen	1 May 1994	1.90 m (6 ft 3 in)	88 kg (194 lb)	(Denmark) Skanderborg Håndbold
18	RB	Martin Christensen Risom	30 June 1994	1.90 m (6 ft 3 in)	95 kg (209 lb)	(Denmark) Skanderborg Håndbold
10	RW	Christian Jensen	15 November 1995	1.86 m (6 ft 1 in)	85 kg (187 lb)	(Denmark) Aarhus Håndbold
06	CB	Sebastian Hennerberg	16 February 1994	1.96 m (6 ft 5 in)	98 kg (216 lb)	(Denmark) Aarhus Håndbold
22	CB	Bach Kristian Bonefeld	16 July 1994	1.96 m (6 ft 5 in)	90 kg (200 lb)	(Denmark) TM Tønder
25	CB	Kragh Cornelius Aastrup	5 May 1995	1.93 m (6 ft 4 in)	100 kg (220 lb)	(Denmark) Nordsjælland Håndbold
09	LB	Kiehn Frederik Clausen	29 June 1995	1.96 m (6 ft 5 in)	100 kg (220 lb)	(Denmark) GOG Gudme
15	LB	Andreas Jensen Holst	1 December 1994	2.02 m (6 ft 8 in)	104 kg (229 lb)	(Denmark) Lemvig-Thyborøn
23	LB	Jacob Holm	5 September 1995	1.94 m (6 ft 4 in)	94 kg (207 lb)	(Denmark) Ribe-Esbjerg HH
07	LW	Pelle Guldager Schilling	21 January 1994	1.85 m (6 ft 1 in)	86 kg (190 lb)	(Denmark) Ribe-Esbjerg HH
19	LW	Magnus Landin Jacobsen	20 August 1995	1.98 m (6 ft 6 in)	88 kg (194 lb)	(Denmark) KIF Kolding
11	LP	Magnus Saugstrup	12 July 1996	1.95 m (6 ft 5 in)	94 kg (207 lb)	(Denmark) Aalborg Håndbold
14	LP	Simon Hald	28 September 1994	2.03 m (6 ft 8 in)	112 kg (247 lb)	(Denmark) Aarhus Håndbold

Legend

GK-Goalkeeper, LW-Left Winger, RW-Right Winger, LP-Line Player, BP-Back, LB-Left Back, CB-Center Back, RB-Right Back.

Role	Name
Head coach	(Denmark) Claus Hansen
Assistant coach	(Denmark) Stefan Madsen
Assistant coach	(Denmark) Micheal Bruun
Physiotherapist	(Denmark) Thomas Petersen Padkaer

== Honours ==
- IHF Junior World Championship
  - Winner: 1997, 1999, 2005, 2025
  - Runner-up: 1993, 2003, 2009, 2011, 2015, 2017
  - Third place: 1983, 2007
- EHF Junior European Handball Championship
  - Winner: 1996, 1998, 2008, 2010
  - Runner-up: 2004
  - Third place: 2006, 2024

== Notable players ==
- Kasper Jørgensen
- Morten Olsen
- Rene Toft Hansen
- Sebastian Koch-Hansen
- Henrik Møllgaard
- Kristian Duvald Friis
- Jonas Aaen Christensen
- Klaus Hvidtfeldt Christensen
- Mads Strange Pedersen
- Simon Edelberg Jensen
- Jacob Halle Petersen
- Kenneth Olsen
- Stephen Dyreborg Nielsen
- Lasse Kronborg Rasmussen
- Rene Bach Madsen
- Simon Kristiansen

- Kasper Hvidt
- Joachim Boldsen
- Michael Rasmussen
- Jesper Jensen
- Morten Jakobsen
- Mads Storgaard
- Lau Jakobsen
- Morten Krampau
- Lars Rasmussen
- Sørenn Rasmussen
- Claus Flensborg
- Kasper Dan Jørgensen
- Anton M. Jensen
- Jonas Pedersen
- Claus Møller Jakobsen

== Notable coaches ==
- (Denmark) Flemming Pedersen
- (Denmark) Henrik Kronborg
