= 1977 Men's Junior World Handball Championship =

Tournament details
- Host country: Sweden
- Dates: 11–19 April
- Teams: 21 (from 3 confederations)

Final positions
- Champions: Soviet Union (1st title)
- Runners-up: Hungary
- Third place: Yugoslavia
- Fourth place: Spain

Tournament statistics
- Matches played: 58
- Goals scored: 2,355 (40.6 per match)

The 1977 Men's Junior World Handball Championship was the first edition of the IHF Men's Junior World Championship, held in Sweden from 11 to 19 April 1977.

== Preliminary round ==
=== Group A ===
Pos	Team	Pld	W	D	L	GF	GA	GD	Pts	Qualification
1	Soviet Union	2	1	0	1	40	38	+2	2	1st–8th place classification
2	East Germany	2	1	0	1	38	40	−2	2	9–16th place classification

Source: Todor66
Rules for classification: 1) points; 2) goal difference; 3) goals scored; 4) head-to-head points; 5) head-to-head goal difference; 6) head-to-head number of goals scored.

11 April 1977	Soviet Union	21–15	East Germany

13 April 1977	East Germany	23–19	Soviet Union

=== Group B ===
Pos	Team	Pld	W	D	L	GF	GA	GD	Pts	Qualification
1	Denmark	2	2	0	0	43	33	+10	4	1st–8th place classification
2	Romania	2	1	0	1	44	22	+22	2	9–16th place classification
3	Morocco	2	0	0	2	24	56	−32	0	17th–21st place classification

Source: Todor66
Rules for classification: 1) points; 2) goal difference; 3) goals scored; 4) head-to-head points; 5) head-to-head goal difference; 6) head-to-head number of goals scored.

11 April 1977	Denmark	27–18	Morocco

12 April 1977	Romania	29–6	Morocco

13 April 1977	Denmark	16–15	Romania

=== Group C ===
Pos	Team	Pld	W	D	L	GF	GA	GD	Pts	Qualification
1	Yugoslavia	2	2	0	0	59	28	+31	4	1st–8th place classification
2	Kuwait	2	0	0	2	28	59	−31	0	9–16th place classification

Source: Todor66
Rules for classification: 1) points; 2) goal difference; 3) goals scored; 4) head-to-head points; 5) head-to-head goal difference; 6) head-to-head number of goals scored.

11 April 1977	Yugoslavia	32–13	Kuwait

13 April 1977	Kuwait	15–27	Yugoslavia

=== Group D ===
Pos	Team	Pld	W	D	L	GF	GA	GD	Pts	Qualification
1	Sweden (H)	2	2	0	0	38	36	+2	4	1st–8th place classification
2	Switzerland	2	1	0	1	44	39	+5	2	9–16th place classification
3	Norway	2	0	0	2	32	39	−7	0	17th–21st place classification

Source: Todor66
Rules for classification: 1) points; 2) goal difference; 3) goals scored; 4) head-to-head points; 5) head-to-head goal difference; 6) head-to-head number of goals scored.
(H) Hosts

11 April 1977	Sweden	22–21	Switzerland

12 April 1977	Sweden	23–17	Norway

13 April 1977	Switzerland	16–15	Norway

=== Group E ===
Pos	Team	Pld	W	D	L	GF	GA	GD	Pts	Qualification
1	Hungary	2	2	0	0	38	30	+8	4	1st–8th place classification
2	Czechoslovakia	2	1	0	1	36	34	+2	2	9–16th place classification
3	Israel	2	0	0	2	33	43	−10	0	17th–21st place classification

Source: Todor66
Rules for classification: 1) points; 2) goal difference; 3) goals scored; 4) head-to-head points; 5) head-to-head goal difference; 6) head-to-head number of goals scored.

11 April 1977	Czechoslovakia	22–17	Israel

12 April 1977	Hungary	17–16	Israel

13 April 1977	Hungary	17–14	Czechoslovakia

=== Group F ===
Pos	Team	Pld	W	D	L	GF	GA	GD	Pts	Qualification
1	Spain	2	2	0	0	61	14	+47	4	1st–8th place classification
2	France	2	1	0	1	49	32	+17	2	9–16th place classification
3	Madagascar	2	0	0	2	18	82	−64	0	17th–21st place classification

Source: Todor66
Rules for classification: 1) points; 2) goal difference; 3) goals scored; 4) head-to-head points; 5) head-to-head goal difference; 6) head-to-head number of goals scored.

April 1977	France	38–15	Madagascar

April 1977	Spain	44–3	Madagascar

13 April 1977	Spain	17–11	France

=== Group G ===
Pos	Team	Pld	W	D	L	GF	GA	GD	Pts	Qualification
1	West Germany	2	2	0	0	38	22	+16	4	1st–8th place classification
2	Austria	2	0	0	2	22	38	−16	0	9–16th place classification

Source: Todor66
Rules for classification: 1) points; 2) goal difference; 3) goals scored; 4) head-to-head points; 5) head-to-head goal difference; 6) head-to-head number of goals scored.

11 April 1977	West Germany	24–9	Austria

13 April 1977	West Germany	14–13	Austria

=== Group H ===
Pos	Team	Pld	W	D	L	GF	GA	GD	Pts	Qualification
1	Poland	2	2	0	0	61	28	+33	4	1st–8th place classification
2	Netherlands	2	1	0	1	33	43	−10	2	9–16th place classification
3	Tunisia	2	0	0	2	29	52	−23	0	17th–21st place classification

Source: Todor66
Rules for classification: 1) points; 2) goal difference; 3) goals scored; 4) head-to-head points; 5) head-to-head goal difference; 6) head-to-head number of goals scored.

12 April 1977	Netherlands	19–15	Tunisia

13 April 1977	Poland	33–14	Tunisia
13 April 1977		(14–6)

14 April 1977	Poland	28–14	Netherlands

== Main round ==
=== 17th–21st place classification ===
==== Group V ====
Pos	Team	Pld	W	D	L	GF	GA	GD	Pts	Qualification
1	Norway	2	2	0	0	45	24	+21	4	17th place game
2	Morocco	2	0	0	2	24	45	−21	0	19th place game

Source: Todor66
Rules for classification: 1) points; 2) goal difference; 3) goals scored; 4) head-to-head points; 5) head-to-head goal difference; 6) head-to-head number of goals scored.

April 1977	Morocco	12–22	Norway

April 1977	Norway	23–12	Morocco

==== Group VI ====
Pos	Team	Pld	W	D	L	GF	GA	GD	Pts	Qualification
1	Israel	1	1	0	0	43	19	+24	2	17th place game
2	Madagascar	1	0	0	1	19	43	−24	0	19th place game
3	Tunisia	0	0	0	0	0	0	0	0	Disqualified

Source: Todor66
Rules for classification: 1) points; 2) goal difference; 3) goals scored; 4) head-to-head points; 5) head-to-head goal difference; 6) head-to-head number of goals scored.

April 1977	Israel	43–19	Madagascar

=== 9–16th place classification ===
==== Group III ====
Pos	Team	Pld	W	D	L	GF	GA	GD	Pts	Qualification
1	East Germany	3	2	1	0	94	48	+46	5	Ninth place game
2	Romania	3	2	1	0	84	53	+31	5	Eleventh place game
3	Switzerland	3	1	0	2	69	70	−1	2	13th place game
4	Kuwait	3	0	0	3	45	121	−76	0	15th place game

Source: Todor66
Rules for classification: 1) points; 2) goal difference; 3) goals scored; 4) head-to-head points; 5) head-to-head goal difference; 6) head-to-head number of goals scored.

April 1977	Switzerland	40–15	Kuwait

April 1977	East Germany	21–21	Romania

April 1977	East Germany	43–14	Kuwait

April 1977	Romania	25–16	Switzerland

April 1977	East Germany	30–13	Switzerland

April 1977	Romania	38–16	Kuwait

==== Group IV ====
Pos	Team	Pld	W	D	L	GF	GA	GD	Pts	Qualification
1	Czechoslovakia	3	3	0	0	71	48	+23	6	Ninth place game
2	France	3	2	0	1	63	57	+6	4	Eleventh place game
3	Austria	3	1	0	2	43	57	−14	2	13th place game
4	Netherlands	3	0	0	3	43	58	−15	0	15th place game

Source: Todor66
Rules for classification: 1) points; 2) goal difference; 3) goals scored; 4) head-to-head points; 5) head-to-head goal difference; 6) head-to-head number of goals scored.

April 1977	Austria	13–12	Netherlands

April 1977	Czechoslovakia	24–20	France

16 April 1977	Czechoslovakia	28–15	Austria
16 April 1977		(13–8)

April 1977	France	26–18	Netherlands

April 1977	Czechoslovakia	19–13	Netherlands

April 1977	France	17–15	Austria

=== 1st–8th place classification ===
==== Group I ====
Pos	Team	Pld	W	D	L	GF	GA	GD	Pts	Qualification
1	Soviet Union	3	3	0	0	81	49	+32	6	Final
2	Yugoslavia	3	2	0	1	61	55	+6	4	Third place game
3	Sweden (H)	3	1	0	2	64	73	−9	2	Fifth place game
4	Denmark	3	0	0	3	56	85	−29	0	Seventh place game

Source: Todor66
Rules for classification: 1) points; 2) goal difference; 3) goals scored; 4) head-to-head points; 5) head-to-head goal difference; 6) head-to-head number of goals scored.
(H) Hosts

14 April 1977	Soviet Union	34–18	Denmark

14 April 1977	Yugoslavia	23–20	Sweden

April 1977	Soviet Union	16–12	Yugoslavia

April 1977	Sweden	25–19	Denmark

April 1977	Yugoslavia	26–19	Denmark

April 1977	Soviet Union	31–19	Sweden

==== Group II ====
Pos	Team	Pld	W	D	L	GF	GA	GD	Pts	Qualification
1	Hungary	3	1	1	1	52	49	+3	3	Final
2	Spain	3	1	1	1	58	56	+2	3	Third place game
3	West Germany	3	1	1	1	50	49	+1	3	Fifth place game
4	Poland	3	1	1	1	59	65	−6	3	Seventh place game

Source: Todor66
Rules for classification: 1) points; 2) goal difference; 3) goals scored; 4) head-to-head points; 5) head-to-head goal difference; 6) head-to-head number of goals scored.

14 April 1977	Hungary	14–14	Spain

14 April 1977	West Germany	16–16	Poland

April 1977	West Germany	16–12	Hungary

April 1977	Poland	24–23	Spain

April 1977	Spain	21–18	West Germany

April 1977	Hungary	26–19	Poland

== Placement games ==
=== 19th place game ===
19 April 1977	Morocco	38–23	Madagascar

=== 17th place game ===
19 April 1977	Israel	20–18	Norway

=== 15th place game ===
19 April 1977	Netherlands	23–17	Kuwait

=== 13th place game ===
19 April 1977	Switzerland	23–15	Austria

=== Eleventh place game ===
19 April 1977	Romania	28–20	France

=== Ninth place game ===
19 April 1977	East Germany	23–21	Czechoslovakia

=== Seventh place game ===
19 April 1977	Poland	18–17 (ET)	Denmark

=== Fifth place game ===
19 April 1977	West Germany	19 21–19	Sweden

=== Third place game ===
19 April 1977	Yugoslavia	24–21	Spain

=== Final ===
19 April 1977	Soviet Union	24–10	Hungary

== Final ranking ==
Rank	Team
Gold medal	Soviet Union
Silver medal	Hungary
Bronze medal	Yugoslavia
4	Spain
5	West Germany
6	Sweden
7	Poland
8	Denmark
9	East Germany
10	Czechoslovakia
11	Romania
12	France
13	Switzerland
14	Austria
15	Netherlands
16	Kuwait
17	Israel
18	Norway
19	Morocco
20	Madagascar
DQ	~~Tunisia~~
