= 1983 Men's Junior World Handball Championship =

Tournament details
- Dates: 3–12 December
- Teams: 16 (from 3 confederations)

Final positions
- Champions: Soviet Union (3rd title)
- Runners-up: West Germany
- Third place: Denmark
- Fourth place: Sweden

Tournament statistics
- Matches played: 48
- Goals scored: 2,113 (44.02 per match)

The 1983 Men's Junior World Handball Championship was the fourth edition of the IHF Men's Junior World Championship, held in Finland from 3 to 12 December 1983.

== Preliminary round ==
=== Group A ===
Pos	Team	Pld	W	D	L	GF	GA	GD	Pts	Qualification
1	Soviet Union	3	3	0	0	97	50	+47	6	1st–8th place classification
2	East Germany	3	2	0	1	90	57	+33	4	1st–8th place classification
3	Egypt	3	1	0	2	54	79	−25	2	9–16th place classification
4	Italy	3	0	0	3	40	95	−55	0	9–16th place classification

Source: IHF
Rules for classification: 1) points; 2) head-to-head points; 3) head-to-head goal difference; 4) head-to-head number of goals scored; 5) goal difference.

1983	Soviet Union	39–13	Italy
1983		(21–8)

1983	East Germany	32–19	Egypt
1983		(20–6)

1983	Soviet Union	33–17	Egypt
1983		(16–9)

1983	East Germany	38–13	Italy
1983		(13–6)

1983	Soviet Union	25–20	East Germany
1983		(14–12)

1983	Egypt	18–14	Italy
1983		(8–6)

=== Group B ===
Pos	Team	Pld	W	D	L	GF	GA	GD	Pts	Qualification
1	Denmark	3	3	0	0	78	60	+18	6	1st–8th place classification
2	Czechoslovakia	3	1	1	1	75	63	+12	3	1st–8th place classification
3	Spain	3	1	1	1	69	56	+13	3	9–16th place classification
4	Kuwait	3	0	0	3	49	92	−43	0	9–16th place classification

Source: IHF
Rules for classification: 1) points; 2) head-to-head points; 3) head-to-head goal difference; 4) head-to-head number of goals scored; 5) goal difference.

1983	Czechoslovakia	20–20	Spain
1983		(10–14)

1983	Denmark	32–16	Kuwait
1983		(14–6)

1983	Czechoslovakia	30–17	Kuwait
1983		(14–8)

1983	Denmark	20–19	Spain
1983		(10–10)

1983	Spain	30–16	Kuwait
1983		(12–9)

1983	Denmark	26–25	Czechoslovakia
1983		(14–13)

=== Group C ===
Pos	Team	Pld	W	D	L	GF	GA	GD	Pts	Qualification
1	Yugoslavia	3	3	0	0	68	57	+11	6	1st–8th place classification
2	West Germany	3	1	0	2	59	54	+5	2	1st–8th place classification
3	Poland	3	1	0	2	60	68	−8	2	9–16th place classification
4	Switzerland	3	1	0	2	54	62	−8	2	9–16th place classification

Source: IHF
Rules for classification: 1) points; 2) head-to-head points; 3) head-to-head goal difference; 4) head-to-head number of goals scored; 5) goal difference.

1983	Yugoslavia	25–17	Switzerland
1983		(11–8)

1983	West Germany	25–17	Poland
1983		(11–9)

1983	Yugoslavia	24–23	Poland
1983		(13–11)

1983	Switzerland	18–17	West Germany
1983		(10–8)

1983	Yugoslavia	19–17	West Germany
1983		(7–8)

1983	Poland	20–19	Switzerland
1983		(8–9)

=== Group D ===
Pos	Team	Pld	W	D	L	GF	GA	GD	Pts	Qualification
1	Sweden	3	3	0	0	81	62	+19	6	1st–8th place classification
2	Finland (H)	3	2	0	1	72	64	+8	4	1st–8th place classification
3	France	3	1	0	2	62	64	−2	2	9–16th place classification
4	Austria	3	0	0	3	55	80	−25	0	9–16th place classification

Source: IHF
Rules for classification: 1) points; 2) head-to-head points; 3) head-to-head goal difference; 4) head-to-head number of goals scored; 5) goal difference.
(H) Hosts

1983	Finland	28–23	France
1983		(11–10)

1983	Sweden	37–22	Austria
1983		(17–14)

1983	Sweden	22–20	Finland
1983		(9–9)

1983	France	19–14	Austria
1983		(7–6)

1983	Finland	24–19	Austria
1983		(12–8)

1983	Sweden	22–20	France
1983		(10–7)

== Main round ==
All points and goals against the team from the same preliminary round were carried over.

=== 9–16th place classification ===
==== Group III ====
Pos	Team	Pld	W	D	L	GF	GA	GD	Pts	Qualification
1	Spain	3	3	0	0	84	48	+36	6	Ninth place game
2	Kuwait	3	1	1	1	57	67	−10	3	Eleventh place game
3	Egypt	3	1	0	2	49	61	−12	2	13th place game
4	Italy	3	0	1	2	52	66	−14	1	15th place game

Source: IHF
Rules for classification: 1) points; 2) head-to-head points; 3) head-to-head goal difference; 4) head-to-head number of goals scored; 5) goal difference.

1983	Spain	26–16	Italy
1983		(11–9)

1983	Kuwait	19–15	Egypt
1983		(9–7)

1983	Kuwait	22–22	Italy
1983		(9–12)

1983	Spain	28–16	Egypt
1983		(13–4)

==== Group IV ====
Pos	Team	Pld	W	D	L	GF	GA	GD	Pts	Qualification
1	Poland	3	3	0	0	64	54	+10	6	Ninth place game
2	Switzerland	3	2	0	1	65	56	+9	4	Eleventh place game
3	France	3	1	0	2	53	56	−3	2	13th place game
4	Austria	3	0	0	3	51	67	−16	0	15th place game

Source: IHF
Rules for classification: 1) points; 2) head-to-head points; 3) head-to-head goal difference; 4) head-to-head number of goals scored; 5) goal difference.

1983	Poland	23–18	Austria
1983		(14–7)

1983	Switzerland	21–17	France
1983		(10–9)

1983	Poland	21–17	France
1983		(12–8)

1983	Switzerland	25–19	Austria
1983		(13–10)

=== 1st–8th place classification ===
==== Group I ====
Pos	Team	Pld	W	D	L	GF	GA	GD	Pts	Qualification
1	Soviet Union	3	3	0	0	73	63	+10	6	Final
2	Denmark	3	2	0	1	70	70	0	4	Third place game
3	East Germany	3	1	0	2	66	73	−7	2	Fifth place game
4	Czechoslovakia	3	0	0	3	72	75	−3	0	Seventh place game

Source: IHF
Rules for classification: 1) points; 2) head-to-head points; 3) head-to-head goal difference; 4) head-to-head number of goals scored; 5) goal difference.

1983	Soviet Union	24–23	Czechoslovakia
1983		(14–9)

1983	Denmark	24–21	East Germany
1983		(9–9)

1983	Soviet Union	24–20	Denmark
1983		(9–10)

1983	East Germany	25–24	Czechoslovakia
1983		(14–10)

==== Group II ====
Pos	Team	Pld	W	D	L	GF	GA	GD	Pts	Qualification
1	West Germany	3	2	0	1	65	58	+7	4	Final
2	Sweden	3	2	0	1	76	74	+2	4	Third place game
3	Yugoslavia	3	2	0	1	74	65	+9	4	Fifth place game
4	Finland (H)	3	0	0	3	53	71	−18	0	Seventh place game

Source: IHF
Rules for classification: 1) points; 2) head-to-head points; 3) head-to-head goal difference; 4) head-to-head number of goals scored; 5) goal difference.
(H) Hosts

1983	West Germany	29–16	Sweden
1983		(13–9)

1983	Yugoslavia	30–20	Finland
1983		(15–8)

1983	West Germany	19–13	Finland
1983		(8–9)

1983	Sweden	28–15	Yugoslavia
1983		(14–13)

== Placement games ==
=== 15th place game ===
1983	Austria	21–18	Italy
1983		(10–8)

=== 13th place game ===
1983	Egypt	20–17	France
1983		(10–8)

=== Eleventh place game ===
1983	Switzerland	26–22	Kuwait
1983		(12–12)

=== Ninth place game ===
1983
Spain
21–20 (ET)
Poland

(9–13)

FT: 18–18 ET: 3–2

=== Seventh place game ===
12 December 1983	Czechoslovakia	23–19	Finland
12 December 1983		(12–9)

=== Fifth place game ===
12 December 1983	Yugoslavia	18–17	East Germany
12 December 1983		(11–9)

=== Third place game ===
12 December 1983	Denmark	31–28	Sweden
12 December 1983		(12–14)

=== Final ===
12 December 1983	Soviet Union	32–17	West Germany
12 December 1983		(12–9)

== Final ranking ==
Rank	Team
Gold medal	Soviet Union
Silver medal	West Germany
Bronze medal	Denmark
4	Sweden
5	Yugoslavia
6	East Germany
7	Czechoslovakia
8	Finland
9	Spain
10	Poland
11	Switzerland
12	Kuwait
13	Egypt
14	France
15	Austria
16	Italy
