= Sweden men's national junior handball team =

Sweden

Information
- Association: Swedish Handball Federation

Colours
1st	2nd

Results

IHF U-21 World Championship
- Appearances: 23 (First in 1977)
- Best result: (gold) Winner (2003, 2007, 2013)

European Junior Championship
- Appearances: 13 (First in 1996)
- Best result: (silver) 2nd (2006, 2014, 2026)
- Last updated on Unknown.

Sweden men's national junior handball team
Medal record

Representing Sweden

Handball

World Junior Championship
Gold medal – first place	2003	
Gold medal – first place	2007	
Gold medal – first place	2013	
Silver medal – second place	1985	
Silver medal – second place	1991	
Silver medal – second place	1999	
Bronze medal – third place	1979	
Bronze medal – third place	2001	

European Junior Championship
Silver medal – second place	2006	
Silver medal – second place	2014	
Silver medal – second place	2026	

The Sweden national junior handball team is the national under–20 handball team of Sweden. Controlled by the Swedish Handball Federation, it represents Sweden in international matches.

== Statistics ==
=== IHF Junior World Championship record ===
Champions Runners up Third place Fourth place

Year	Round	Position	GP	W	D	L	GS	GA	GD
1977 (Sweden)		6th place							
1979 (Denmark) (Sweden)	Semi-Finals	3rd place							
1981 (Portugal)	Semi-Finals	4th place							
1983 (Finland)	Semi-Finals	4th place							
1985 (Italy)	Final	2nd place							
1987 (Socialist Federal Republic of Yugoslavia)	Semi-Finals	4th place							
1989 (Spain)		7th place							
1991 (Greece)	Final	2nd place							
1993 (Egypt)		5th place							
1995 (Argentina)		12th place							
1997 (Turkey)	Didn't Qualify								
1999 (Qatar)	Final	2nd place							
2001 (Switzerland)	Semi-Finals	3rd place							
2003 (Brazil)	Final	Champions							
2005 (Hungary)		15th place							
2007 (North Macedonia)	Final	Champions							
2009 (Egypt)	Main round	5th place							
2011 (Greece)	Quarterfinals	7th place							
2013 (Bosnia and Herzegovina)	Final	Champions							
2015 (Brazil)	Quarterfinals	5th place							
2017 (Algeria)	Round of 16	15th place							
2019 (Spain)	Round of 16	11th place							
2023 (Germany) (Greece)	Main round	12th place							
2025 (Poland)	Semi-Finals	4th place							
Total	23/24	3 Titles							

=== EHF European Junior Championship ===
Champions Runners up Third place Fourth place

European Junior Championship record
Year	Round	Position	GP	W	D	L	GS	GA	GD
(Romania) 1996		11th place							
(Austria) 1998		5th place							
(Greece) 2000	Didn't Qualify								
(Poland) 2002	Didn't Qualify								
(Latvia) 2004		5th place							
(Austria) 2006	Final	2nd place							
(Romania) 2008	Semi-finals	4th place							
(Slovakia) 2010		5th place							
(Turkey) 2012	Semi-finals	4th place							
(Austria) 2014	Final	2nd place							
(Denmark) 2016		9th place							
(Slovenia) 2018		10th place							
(Portugal) 2022	Semi-finals	4th place							
(Slovenia) 2024	Main Round	5th place							
(Slovenia) 2026	Final	2nd place							
Total	13/15	0 Titles							
