= Russia men's national junior handball team =

Russia

Information
- Association: Handball Union of Russia

Colours
| 1st | 2nd |

Results

IHF U-21 World Championship
- Appearances: 9 (First in 1993)
- Best result: (gold) Winner, (1995, 2001)

European Junior Championship
- Appearances: 10 (First in 1996)
- Best result: (bronze) 3rd, (1996)
- Last updated on Unknown.

The Russia national junior handball team is the national under–20 handball team of Russia. Controlled by the Handball Union of Russia, it represented Russia in international matches.

In reaction to the 2022 Russian invasion of Ukraine, the International Handball Federation banned Russian and Belarus athletes and officials, and the European Handball Federation suspended the national teams of Russia and Belarus as well as Russian and Belarusian clubs competing in European handball competitions. Referees, officials, and commission members from Russia and Belarus will not be called upon for future activities. And new organisers will be sought for the YAC 16 EHF Beach Handball EURO and the Qualifier Tournaments for the Beach Handball EURO 2023, which were to be held in Moscow. In addition, it refused to allow competitions to be held in Russia. The Russian Handball Federation failed in its appeal against the decision to exclude Russia's teams from continental competition, which was rejected by the European Handball Federation Court of Handball.
