= 1985 Men's Junior World Handball Championship =

Tournament details
- Dates: 7–15 December
- Teams: 16 (from 3 confederations)

Final positions
- Champions: Soviet Union (4th title)
- Runners-up: Sweden
- Third place: Yugoslavia
- Fourth place: West Germany

Tournament statistics
- Matches played: 54
- Goals scored: 2,529 (46.83 per match)

The 1985 Men's Junior World Handball Championship was the fifth edition of the IHF Men's Junior World Championship, held in Italy from 7 to 15 December 1985.

== Preliminary round ==
=== Group A ===
Pos	Team	Pld	W	D	L	GF	GA	GD	Pts	Qualification
1	Sweden	3	3	0	0	71	56	+15	6	Main round
2	East Germany	3	1	1	1	65	64	+1	3	Main round
3	Switzerland	3	1	1	1	66	65	+1	3	Main round
4	Poland	3	0	0	3	55	72	−17	0	Classification round

Source: Todor66
Rules for classification: 1) points; 2) head-to-head points; 3) head-to-head goal difference; 4) head-to-head number of goals scored; 5) goal difference.

1985	Sweden	21–18	Switzerland
1985		(13–9)

1985	East Germany	21–17	Poland
1985		(9–4)

1985	Poland	17–26	Sweden
1985		(5–13)

1985	Switzerland	23–23	East Germany
1985		(13–13)

1985	Sweden	24–21	East Germany
1985		(13–10)

1985	Switzerland	25–21	Poland
1985		(14–8)

=== Group B ===
Pos	Team	Pld	W	D	L	GF	GA	GD	Pts	Qualification
1	West Germany	3	3	0	0	80	62	+18	6	Main round
2	Iceland	3	1	0	2	44	47	−3	2	Main round
3	Italy	3	1	0	2	61	68	−7	2	Main round
4	Egypt	3	1	0	2	56	64	−8	2	Classification round

Source: Todor66
Rules for classification: 1) points; 2) head-to-head points; 3) head-to-head goal difference; 4) head-to-head number of goals scored; 5) goal difference.

1985	Iceland	16–15	Italy
1985		(10–8)

1985	West Germany	29–23	Egypt
1985		(14–9)

1985	Iceland	13–14	Egypt
1985		(9–8)

1985	Italy	24–33	West Germany
1985		(8–19)

1985	Egypt	19–22	Italy
1985		(6–9)

1985	West Germany	18–15	Iceland
1985		(9–6)

=== Group C ===
Pos	Team	Pld	W	D	L	GF	GA	GD	Pts	Qualification
1	Soviet Union	3	3	0	0	99	66	+33	6	Main round
2	Czechoslovakia	3	2	0	1	79	59	+20	4	Main round
3	Japan	3	1	0	2	66	93	−27	2	Main round
4	Nigeria	3	0	0	3	61	87	−26	0	Classification round

Source: Todor66
Rules for classification: 1) points; 2) head-to-head points; 3) head-to-head goal difference; 4) head-to-head number of goals scored; 5) goal difference.

1985	Soviet Union	39–28	Japan
1985		(20–16)

1985	Czechoslovakia	28–20	Nigeria
1985		(16–13)

1985	Japan	13–30	Czechoslovakia
1985		(8–14)

1985	Nigeria	17–34	Soviet Union
1985		(9–16)

1985	Japan	25–24	Nigeria
1985		(14–9)

1985	Soviet Union	26–21	Czechoslovakia
1985		(14–12)

=== Group D ===
Pos	Team	Pld	W	D	L	GF	GA	GD	Pts	Qualification
1	Yugoslavia	3	3	0	0	72	63	+9	6	Main round
2	Spain	3	2	0	1	62	61	+1	4	Main round
3	Denmark	3	1	0	2	72	67	+5	2	Main round
4	South Korea	3	0	0	3	86	101	−15	0	Classification round

Source: Todor66
Rules for classification: 1) points; 2) head-to-head points; 3) head-to-head goal difference; 4) head-to-head number of goals scored; 5) goal difference.

1985	Denmark	21–22	Yugoslavia
1985		(13–12)

1985	Spain	33–28	South Korea
1985		(20–17)

1985	South Korea	27–34	Denmark
1985		(12–13)

1985	Spain	11–16	Yugoslavia
1985		(6–7)

1985	Yugoslavia	34–31	South Korea
1985		(17–15)

1985	Denmark	17–18	Spain
1985		(7–12)

== Classification round ==
Pos	Team	Pld	W	D	L	GF	GA	GD	Pts
13	South Korea	3	3	0	0	103	80	+23	6
14	Poland	3	2	0	1	82	81	+1	4
15	Egypt	3	1	0	2	66	76	−10	2
16	Nigeria	3	0	0	3	72	86	−14	0

Source: Todor66
Rules for classification: 1) points; 2) head-to-head points; 3) head-to-head goal difference; 4) head-to-head number of goals scored; 5) goal difference.

1985	Poland	27–23	Nigeria
1985		(12–10)

1985	Egypt	24–28	South Korea
1985		(10–12)

1985	South Korea	37–27	Poland
1985		(18–11)

1985	Nigeria	20–21	Egypt
1985		(8–12)

1985	Nigeria	29–38	South Korea
1985		(8–17)

1985	Poland	28–21	Egypt
1985		(12–12)

== Main round ==
All points and goals against the team from the same preliminary round were carried over.

=== Group I ===
Pos	Team	Pld	W	D	L	GF	GA	GD	Pts	Qualification
1	Sweden	5	5	0	0	121	97	+24	10	Final
2	West Germany	5	3	1	1	113	98	+15	7	
3	East Germany	5	2	1	2	115	106	+9	5	
4	Iceland	5	2	0	3	91	93	−2	4	
5	Switzerland	5	1	2	2	97	101	−4	4	
6	Italy	5	0	0	5	91	133	−42	0	

Source: Todor66
Rules for classification: 1) points; 2) head-to-head points; 3) head-to-head goal difference; 4) head-to-head number of goals scored; 5) goal difference.

1985	Sweden	30–15	Italy
1985		(13–9)

1985	East Germany	25–19	Iceland
1985		(9–12)

1985	Switzerland	16–16	West Germany
1985		(9–7)

7 December 1985	West Germany	21–16	East Germany
7 December 1985		(11–8)

7 December 1985	Iceland	18–19	Sweden
7 December 1985		(8–7)

7 December 1985	Italy	18–24	Switzerland
7 December 1985		(8–9)

1985	Sweden	30–19	Italy
1985		(15–9)

1985	East Germany	27–25	Iceland
1985		(15–9)

1985	Switzerland	16–23	West Germany
1985		(9–10)

=== Group II ===
Pos	Team	Pld	W	D	L	GF	GA	GD	Pts	Qualification
1	Soviet Union	5	4	1	0	156	130	+26	9	Final
2	Yugoslavia	5	3	1	1	124	113	+11	7	
3	Czechoslovakia	5	3	0	2	112	94	+18	6	
4	Denmark	5	2	0	3	108	101	+7	4	
5	Spain	5	2	0	3	101	104	−3	4	
6	Japan	5	0	0	5	102	161	−59	0	

Source: Todor66
Rules for classification: 1) points; 2) head-to-head points; 3) head-to-head goal difference; 4) head-to-head number of goals scored; 5) goal difference.

1985	Soviet Union	30–24	Denmark
1985		(16–11)

1985	Japan	28–37	Yugoslavia
1985		(13–18)

1985	Czechoslovakia	21–17	Spain
1985		(10–7)

7 December 1985	Yugoslavia	20–24	Czechoslovakia
7 December 1985		(8–12)

7 December 1985	Denmark	28–15	Japan
7 December 1985		(13–7)

7 December 1985	Spain	28–32	Soviet Union
7 December 1985		(12–14)

1985	Soviet Union	29–29	Yugoslavia
1985		(15–12)

1985	Czechoslovakia	16–18	Denmark
1985		(11–11)

1985	Japan	18–27	Spain
1985		(9–12)

== Placement games ==
=== Eleventh place game ===
15 December 1985	Italy	17–19	Japan
15 December 1985		(8–7)

=== Ninth place game ===
15 December 1985	Switzerland	25–21	Spain
15 December 1985		(13–13)

=== Seventh place game ===
15 December 1985	Iceland	28–33	Denmark
15 December 1985		(12–11)

=== Fifth place game ===
15 December 1985	East Germany	24–22	Czechoslovakia
15 December 1985		(6–11)

=== Third place game ===
15 December 1985	West Germany	22–23	Yugoslavia
15 December 1985		(11–13)

=== Final ===
15 December 1985	Sweden	27–32	Soviet Union
15 December 1985		(13–16)

== Final ranking ==
Rank	Team
Gold medal	Soviet Union
Silver medal	Sweden
Bronze medal	Yugoslavia
4	West Germany
5	East Germany
6	Czechoslovakia
7	Denmark
8	Iceland
9	Switzerland
10	Spain
11	Japan
12	Italy
13	South Korea
14	Poland
15	Egypt
16	Nigeria
