= Spain men's national junior handball team =

Spain

Information
- Association: Royal Spanish Handball Federation

Colours
1st	2nd

Results

IHF U-21 World Championship
- Appearances: 22 (First in 1977)
- Best result: (gold) Champions (2017)

EHF U-20 European Championship
- Appearances: 12 (First in 1996)
- Best result: (gold) Champions (2012, 2016, 2022)
- Last updated on Unknown.

The Spain national junior handball team is the national under–20 handball team of Spain. Controlled by the Royal Spanish Handball Federation, it represents Spain in international matches.
