= 2024 European Men's U-20 Handball Championship =

14th edition of the European Men's U-20 Handball Championship

Tournament details
- Host country: Slovenia
- Cities: Celje, Laško
- Venues: 3 (in 2 host cities)
- Dates: 10–21 July 2024
- Teams: 24 (from 1 confederation)

Final positions
- Champions: Spain (4th title)
- Runners-up: Portugal
- Third place: Denmark
- Fourth place: Germany

Official website
- www.eurohandball.com

The 2024 European Men's U-20 Handball Championship is the 14th edition of the European Men's U-20 Handball Championship. The tournament is being played in Celje and Laško, Slovenia, from 10 to 21 July 2024. Spain are the defending champions.

== Host selection ==
- Slovenia

On 31 March 2023, Slovenia was given the hosting rights with the games to be played in Celje.

== Expansion ==
After the U-18 Euro was officially expanded to 24 teams, the EHF decided to also expand the U-20 competition to 24 teams also on 23 September 2022.

== Format ==
In the first round, 24 teams are divided into 6 groups of 4:

- The six group winners plus the two best runner up (one from Groups A, B and C and one from Groups D, E and F) advance to the Main round.
- The four worst runners up and the four best third place teams (two from Groups A, B and C and two from Groups D, E and F) move on to the Intermediate round.
- The two worst third place teams (one from Groups A, B and C and one from Groups D, E and F) and all fourth place teams play in the Elimination round.

In the Second round, all teams are again split into 6 groups of 4, but this time, against the teams who advanced to the same round as them. Each separate phase (Main, Intermediate and Elimination) consist of eight teams and are split into 2 group of four.

- The teams in the Main round fight to win the championship.
- The teams in the Intermediate round play for rankings 9–16.
- The teams in the Elimination round play for positions 17–24 and to not get relegated.

Regarding the Main round, The top two from each group progresses to the semifinals, where the winners of the semifinals play for the title, while the two semifinal losers play for bronze.

== Qualification ==
To accommodate 24 teams and fill in the eight extra spots, the EHF decided to not relegate anyone in 2022 and promote the three runners up from the Men's 19 EHF Championship. The last two spots are occupied by the two best ranked teams not yet qualified for the competition. Those two were Greece and Romania.

Competition	Dates	Host	Vacancies	Qualified
Host nation	31 March 2023	(Turkey) Istanbul	1	Slovenia
Men's 18 EHF EURO 2022	4–14 August 2022	Montenegro	15	Spain; Sweden; Germany; Hungary; Croatia; Denmark; Hungary; Portugal; Faroe Islands; Iceland; Montenegro; Serbia; France; Poland; Italy
Men's 19 EHF Championship 2022	7–13 August 2022	(Israel) Tel Aviv	2	Czech Republic; Israel
Men's 19 EHF Championship 2022	8–14 August 2022	(Latvia) Riga	2	North Macedonia; Switzerland
Men's 19 EHF Championship 2022	8–14 August 2022	(Romania) Craiova	2	Austria; Ukraine
EHF Rankings			2	Romania; Greece

== Venues ==
The venues are in Celje and Laško.

2024 European Men's U-20 Handball Championship is located in Slovenia
Celje	Celje	Laško
Zlatorog Arena; Capacity: 5,191	Golovec Hall; Capacity: 3,200	Tri Lilije Hall; Capacity: 2,500

== Draw ==
The draw was held on 29 February 2024 in Vienna at 15:00 (CET). Prior to the draw, Austria, Czech Republic and North Macedonia, who all had the same EHF ranking, would be placed into a separate draw to determine each team's position in the draw. Later on, Austria and Czech Republic won the draw and were both placed in pot 3.

Pot 1	Pot 2	Pot 3	Pot 4
Spain; Sweden; Germany; Hungary; Croatia; Denmark	Norway; Portugal; Slovenia; Faroe Islands; Iceland; Montenegro	Serbia; France; Poland; Italy; Austria; Czech Republic	North Macedonia; Ukraine; Israel; Switzerland; Romania; Greece

== Preliminary round ==
=== Group A ===
Pos	Team	Pld	W	D	L	GF	GA	GD	Pts	Qualification
1	Austria	3	2	1	0	81	61	+20	5	Main round
2	North Macedonia	3	1	2	0	75	65	+10	4	Intermediate round
3	Croatia	3	1	1	1	81	77	+4	3	Intermediate round
4	Montenegro	3	0	0	3	65	99	−34	0	Elimination round

Source: EHF
Rules for classification: 1) points; 2) head-to-head points; 3) head-to-head goal difference; 4) head-to-head number of goals scored; 5) Goal difference.

10 July 2024; 12:00	Montenegro	21–31	North Macedonia	Zlatorog Arena, Celje; Attendance: 80; Referees: I. Covalciuc, A. Covalciuc (MDA)
10 July 2024; 12:00	Dobrković 6	(5–12)	Uzunchev 8	Zlatorog Arena, Celje; Attendance: 80; Referees: I. Covalciuc, A. Covalciuc (MDA)
10 July 2024; 12:00	1× (yellow card) 1× (suspension)	Report	6× (suspension) 2× (red card)	Zlatorog Arena, Celje; Attendance: 80; Referees: I. Covalciuc, A. Covalciuc (MDA)

10 July 2024; 16:40	Croatia	23–27	Austria	Zlatorog Arena, Celje; Attendance: 108; Referees: Pepe, Merisi (ITA)
10 July 2024; 16:40	Čaprić 5	(10–15)	Meleschnig 6	Zlatorog Arena, Celje; Attendance: 108; Referees: Pepe, Merisi (ITA)
10 July 2024; 16:40	6× (suspension)	Report	1× (yellow card) 5× (suspension)	Zlatorog Arena, Celje; Attendance: 108; Referees: Pepe, Merisi (ITA)

11 July 2024; 12:00	North Macedonia	24–24	Croatia	Zlatorog Arena, Celje; Attendance: 266; Referees: Mandak, Rudinsky (SVK)
11 July 2024; 12:00	Shuleski, Uzunchev 6	(10–15)	Bajan, Franković 6	Zlatorog Arena, Celje; Attendance: 266; Referees: Mandak, Rudinsky (SVK)
11 July 2024; 12:00	1× (yellow card) 6× (suspension)	Report	4× (suspension)	Zlatorog Arena, Celje; Attendance: 266; Referees: Mandak, Rudinsky (SVK)

11 July 2024; 16:40	Austria	34–18	Montenegro	Zlatorog Arena, Celje; Attendance: 85; Referees: Petursson, Thrastarson (ISL)
11 July 2024; 16:40	Kofler 8	(15–9)	Knežević 5	Zlatorog Arena, Celje; Attendance: 85; Referees: Petursson, Thrastarson (ISL)
11 July 2024; 16:40	3× (suspension)	Report	5× (suspension)	Zlatorog Arena, Celje; Attendance: 85; Referees: Petursson, Thrastarson (ISL)

13 July 2024; 14:20	Austria	20–20	North Macedonia	Zlatorog Arena, Celje; Referees: Weijmans, Wolbertus (NED)
13 July 2024; 14:20	Meleschnig 4	(11–10)	Uzunchev 8	Zlatorog Arena, Celje; Referees: Weijmans, Wolbertus (NED)
13 July 2024; 14:20	5× (suspension)	Report	3× (yellow card) 7× (suspension) 1× (red card)	Zlatorog Arena, Celje; Referees: Weijmans, Wolbertus (NED)

13 July 2024; 16:20	Croatia	34–26	Montenegro	Zlatorog Arena, Celje; Attendance: 168; Referees: Loshak, Novikov (UKR)
13 July 2024; 16:20	Čaprić 8	(16–15)	Radovanović 8	Zlatorog Arena, Celje; Attendance: 168; Referees: Loshak, Novikov (UKR)
13 July 2024; 16:20	1× (yellow card) 2× (suspension)	Report	2× (suspension)	Zlatorog Arena, Celje; Attendance: 168; Referees: Loshak, Novikov (UKR)

=== Group B ===
Pos	Team	Pld	W	D	L	GF	GA	GD	Pts	Qualification
1	Portugal	3	3	0	0	93	67	+26	6	Main round
2	Germany	3	2	0	1	89	73	+16	4	Main round
3	Serbia	3	1	0	2	94	86	+8	2	Intermediate round
4	Greece	3	0	0	3	66	116	−50	0	Elimination round

Source: EHF
Rules for classification: 1) points; 2) head-to-head points; 3) head-to-head goal difference; 4) head-to-head number of goals scored; 5) Goal difference.

10 July 2024; 14:20	Portugal	40–22	Greece	Tri Lilije Hall, Laško; Attendance: 50; Referees: Svensson, Hummelgard (SWE)
10 July 2024; 14:20	Oliveira 7	(19–7)	Tsioumas 4	Tri Lilije Hall, Laško; Attendance: 50; Referees: Svensson, Hummelgard (SWE)
10 July 2024; 14:20	2× (suspension)	Report	2× (suspension)	Tri Lilije Hall, Laško; Attendance: 50; Referees: Svensson, Hummelgard (SWE)

10 July 2024; 19:00	Germany	33–29	Serbia	Tri Lilije Hall, Laško; Attendance: 151; Referees: Petursson, Thrastarson (ISL)
10 July 2024; 19:00	Haake 7	(17–13)	Antonijević 8	Tri Lilije Hall, Laško; Attendance: 151; Referees: Petursson, Thrastarson (ISL)
10 July 2024; 19:00	2× (yellow card) 2× (suspension)	Report	1× (yellow card) 7× (suspension)	Tri Lilije Hall, Laško; Attendance: 151; Referees: Petursson, Thrastarson (ISL)

11 July 2024; 14:20	Serbia	28–32	Portugal	Tri Lilije Hall, Laško; Attendance: 200; Referees: Lohsak, Novikov (UKR)
11 July 2024; 14:20	Milovanović 6	(14–15)	Brandão 9	Tri Lilije Hall, Laško; Attendance: 200; Referees: Lohsak, Novikov (UKR)
11 July 2024; 14:20	2× (yellow card) 6× (suspension)	Report	2× (yellow card) 6× (suspension)	Tri Lilije Hall, Laško; Attendance: 200; Referees: Lohsak, Novikov (UKR)

11 July 2024; 19:00	Greece	23–39	Germany	Tri Lilije Hall, Laško; Attendance: 150; Referees: Weber, Weinquin (LUX)
11 July 2024; 19:00	Batis 7	(14–18)	Siemer 7	Tri Lilije Hall, Laško; Attendance: 150; Referees: Weber, Weinquin (LUX)
11 July 2024; 19:00	1× (yellow card) 6× (suspension)	Report	6× (suspension)	Tri Lilije Hall, Laško; Attendance: 150; Referees: Weber, Weinquin (LUX)

13 July 2024; 12:00	Serbia	37–21	Greece	Tri Lilije Hall, Laško; Attendance: 100; Referees: Kull, Tint (EST)
13 July 2024; 12:00	Feješ, Rančić 7	(20–8)	three players 4	Tri Lilije Hall, Laško; Attendance: 100; Referees: Kull, Tint (EST)
13 July 2024; 12:00	5× (suspension)	Report	3× (suspension)	Tri Lilije Hall, Laško; Attendance: 100; Referees: Kull, Tint (EST)

13 July 2024; 19:00	Germany	17–21	Portugal	Tri Lilije Hall, Laško; Attendance: 109; Referees: Puksic, Satler (SLO)
13 July 2024; 19:00	Schmidt 6	(11–9)	Brandão 5	Tri Lilije Hall, Laško; Attendance: 109; Referees: Puksic, Satler (SLO)
13 July 2024; 19:00	1× (yellow card) 3× (suspension)	Report	4× (suspension) 1× (red card)	Tri Lilije Hall, Laško; Attendance: 109; Referees: Puksic, Satler (SLO)

=== Group C ===
Pos	Team	Pld	W	D	L	GF	GA	GD	Pts	Qualification
1	Spain	3	3	0	0	113	81	+32	6	Main round
2	France	3	2	0	1	100	100	0	4	Intermediate round
3	Faroe Islands	3	1	0	2	91	99	−8	2	Elimination round
4	Switzerland	3	0	0	3	81	105	−24	0	Elimination round

Source: EHF
Rules for classification: 1) points; 2) head-to-head points; 3) head-to-head goal difference; 4) head-to-head number of goals scored; 5) Goal difference.

10 July 2024; 12:00	Faroe Islands	30–29	Switzerland	Zlatorog Arena, Celje; Attendance: 120; Referees: Loshak, Novikov (UKR)
10 July 2024; 12:00	Mittún 8	(21–15)	Schnyder 7	Zlatorog Arena, Celje; Attendance: 120; Referees: Loshak, Novikov (UKR)
10 July 2024; 12:00	2× (suspension)	Report	1× (yellow card) 2× (suspension)	Zlatorog Arena, Celje; Attendance: 120; Referees: Loshak, Novikov (UKR)

10 July 2024; 16:40	Spain	37–31	France	Zlatorog Arena, Celje; Attendance: 130; Referees: Puksic, Salter (SLO)
10 July 2024; 16:40	D. Cikuša, P. Cikuša 8	(19–18)	Karamoko 6	Zlatorog Arena, Celje; Attendance: 130; Referees: Puksic, Salter (SLO)
10 July 2024; 16:40	2× (suspension)	Report	5× (suspension)	Zlatorog Arena, Celje; Attendance: 130; Referees: Puksic, Salter (SLO)

11 July 2024; 12:00	Switzerland	20–40	Spain	Zlatorog Arena, Celje; Attendance: 58; Referees: Merisi, Pepe (ITA)
11 July 2024; 12:00	Steenaerts 6	(10–19)	Castillo Oliveras 6	Zlatorog Arena, Celje; Attendance: 58; Referees: Merisi, Pepe (ITA)
11 July 2024; 12:00	6× (suspension)	Report	1× (yellow card) 1× (suspension)	Zlatorog Arena, Celje; Attendance: 58; Referees: Merisi, Pepe (ITA)

11 July 2024; 16:40	France	34–31	Faroe Islands	Zlatorog Arena, Celje; Attendance: 101; Referees: I. Covalciuc, A. Covalciuc (MDA)
11 July 2024; 16:40	Prat 7	(17–14)	Mittún 13	Zlatorog Arena, Celje; Attendance: 101; Referees: I. Covalciuc, A. Covalciuc (MDA)
11 July 2024; 16:40	7× (suspension)	Report	4× (suspension)	Zlatorog Arena, Celje; Attendance: 101; Referees: I. Covalciuc, A. Covalciuc (MDA)

13 July 2024; 14:20	France	35–32	Switzerland	Zlatorog Arena, Celje; Attendance: 250; Referees: Petursson, Thrastarson (ISL)
13 July 2024; 14:20	Favril, Zuzo 6	(15–16)	Sarlos 7	Zlatorog Arena, Celje; Attendance: 250; Referees: Petursson, Thrastarson (ISL)
13 July 2024; 14:20	6× (suspension)	Report	9× (suspension)	Zlatorog Arena, Celje; Attendance: 250; Referees: Petursson, Thrastarson (ISL)

13 July 2024; 16:40	Spain	36–30	Faroe Islands	Zlatorog Arena, Celje; Attendance: 255; Referees: Mandak, Rudinsky (SVK)
13 July 2024; 16:40	P. Cikuša, Romero Holguin 7	(18–16)	Mittún, Vedelsbøl 11	Zlatorog Arena, Celje; Attendance: 255; Referees: Mandak, Rudinsky (SVK)
13 July 2024; 16:40	4× (suspension)	Report	1× (yellow card) 5× (suspension)	Zlatorog Arena, Celje; Attendance: 255; Referees: Mandak, Rudinsky (SVK)

=== Group D ===
Pos	Team	Pld	W	D	L	GF	GA	GD	Pts	Qualification
1	Norway	3	3	0	0	106	87	+19	6	Main round
2	Hungary	3	2	0	1	91	85	+6	4	Intermediate round
3	Romania	3	1	0	2	86	99	−13	2	Intermediate round
4	Czech Republic	3	0	0	3	84	96	−12	0	Elimination round

Source: EHF
Rules for classification: 1) points; 2) head-to-head points; 3) head-to-head goal difference; 4) head-to-head number of goals scored; 5) Goal difference.

10 July 2024; 14:20	Norway	35–27	Romania	Zlatorog Arena, Celje; Attendance: 200; Referees: Weber, Weinquin (LUX)
10 July 2024; 14:20	Anderson, Solheim 9	(16–13)	Radu 6	Zlatorog Arena, Celje; Attendance: 200; Referees: Weber, Weinquin (LUX)
10 July 2024; 14:20	4× (suspension)	Report	5× (suspension)	Zlatorog Arena, Celje; Attendance: 200; Referees: Weber, Weinquin (LUX)

10 July 2024; 19:00	Hungary	27–24	Czech Republic	Zlatorog Arena, Celje; Attendance: 200; Referees: Barysas, Petrusis (LTU)
10 July 2024; 19:00	Kovács 6	(16–13)	Bláha 10	Zlatorog Arena, Celje; Attendance: 200; Referees: Barysas, Petrusis (LTU)
10 July 2024; 19:00	3× (suspension)	Report	2× (yellow card) 3× (suspension)	Zlatorog Arena, Celje; Attendance: 200; Referees: Barysas, Petrusis (LTU)

11 July 2024; 14:20	Czech Republic	28–36	Norway	Zlatorog Arena, Celje; Attendance: 300; Referees: D. Loncar, Z. Loncar (CRO)
11 July 2024; 14:20	Bláha 6	(15–18)	Anderson 12	Zlatorog Arena, Celje; Attendance: 300; Referees: D. Loncar, Z. Loncar (CRO)
11 July 2024; 14:20	1× (yellow card) 4× (suspension)	Report	2× (suspension)	Zlatorog Arena, Celje; Attendance: 300; Referees: D. Loncar, Z. Loncar (CRO)

11 July 2024; 19:00	Romania	26–32	Hungary	Zlatorog Arena, Celje; Attendance: 345; Referees: Ivanovic, Vujisic (MNE)
11 July 2024; 19:00	Stanciuc 8	(12–17)	Kovács 7	Zlatorog Arena, Celje; Attendance: 345; Referees: Ivanovic, Vujisic (MNE)
11 July 2024; 19:00	1× (yellow card) 2× (suspension)	Report	2× (suspension)	Zlatorog Arena, Celje; Attendance: 345; Referees: Ivanovic, Vujisic (MNE)

13 July 2024; 12:00	Czech Republic	32–33	Romania	Zlatorog Arena, Celje; Attendance: 166; Referees: Maia, André (POR)
13 July 2024; 12:00	three players 5	(17–22)	Stanciuc 11	Zlatorog Arena, Celje; Attendance: 166; Referees: Maia, André (POR)
13 July 2024; 12:00	4× (suspension)	Report	1× (yellow card) 6× (suspension) 1× (red card)	Zlatorog Arena, Celje; Attendance: 166; Referees: Maia, André (POR)

13 July 2024; 19:00	Hungary	32–35	Norway	Zlatorog Arena, Celje; Attendance: 117; Referees: I. Covalciuc, A. Covalciuc (MDA)
13 July 2024; 19:00	Kovács 10	(19–21)	Anderson 8	Zlatorog Arena, Celje; Attendance: 117; Referees: I. Covalciuc, A. Covalciuc (MDA)
13 July 2024; 19:00	3× (suspension) 1× (red card)	Report	2× (yellow card) 6× (suspension)	Zlatorog Arena, Celje; Attendance: 117; Referees: I. Covalciuc, A. Covalciuc (MDA)

=== Group E ===
Pos	Team	Pld	W	D	L	GF	GA	GD	Pts	Qualification
1	Denmark	3	3	0	0	109	73	+36	6	Main round
2	Slovenia (H)	3	2	0	1	96	100	−4	4	Intermediate round
3	Italy	3	1	0	2	86	102	−16	2	Elimination round
4	Israel	3	0	0	3	84	100	−16	0	Elimination round

Source: EHF
Rules for classification: 1) points; 2) head-to-head points; 3) head-to-head goal difference; 4) head-to-head number of goals scored; 5) Goal difference.
(H) Hosts

10 July 2024; 14:20	Denmark	38–21	Italy	Zlatorog Arena, Celje; Attendance: 115; Referees: Kull, Tint (EST)
10 July 2024; 14:20	Pedersen, Vestergaard 5	(16–10)	De Angelis 5	Zlatorog Arena, Celje; Attendance: 115; Referees: Kull, Tint (EST)
10 July 2024; 14:20	1× (suspension)	Report	2× (suspension)	Zlatorog Arena, Celje; Attendance: 115; Referees: Kull, Tint (EST)

10 July 2024; 19:15	Slovenia	33–31	Israel	Zlatorog Arena, Celje; Attendance: 345; Referees: Ivanovic, Vujisic (MNE)
10 July 2024; 19:15	Marguc 9	(17–13)	Sharon 11	Zlatorog Arena, Celje; Attendance: 345; Referees: Ivanovic, Vujisic (MNE)
10 July 2024; 19:15	8× (suspension)	Report	1× (yellow card) 9× (suspension) 1× (red card)	Zlatorog Arena, Celje; Attendance: 345; Referees: Ivanovic, Vujisic (MNE)

11 July 2024; 14:20	Israel	27–37	Denmark	Zlatorog Arena, Celje; Attendance: 125; Referees: Barysas, Petrusis (LTU)
11 July 2024; 14:20	Gonen 8	(15–21)	Pedersen 7	Zlatorog Arena, Celje; Attendance: 125; Referees: Barysas, Petrusis (LTU)
11 July 2024; 14:20	1× (yellow card)	Report	2× (suspension)	Zlatorog Arena, Celje; Attendance: 125; Referees: Barysas, Petrusis (LTU)

11 July 2024; 19:00	Italy	35–38	Slovenia	Zlatorog Arena, Celje; Attendance: 280; Referees: Maia, Nunes (POR)
11 July 2024; 19:00	Manojlovic 12	(16–19)	Marguc, Zajc 8	Zlatorog Arena, Celje; Attendance: 280; Referees: Maia, Nunes (POR)
11 July 2024; 19:00	6× (suspension) 1× (red card)	Report	2× (suspension)	Zlatorog Arena, Celje; Attendance: 280; Referees: Maia, Nunes (POR)

13 July 2024; 12:00	Italy	30–26	Israel	Zlatorog Arena, Celje; Attendance: 210; Referees: Hummelgard, Svensson (SWE)
13 July 2024; 12:00	Manojlovic 9	(10–11)	Gonen 8	Zlatorog Arena, Celje; Attendance: 210; Referees: Hummelgard, Svensson (SWE)
13 July 2024; 12:00	4× (suspension)	Report	1× (yellow card) 2× (suspension)	Zlatorog Arena, Celje; Attendance: 210; Referees: Hummelgard, Svensson (SWE)

13 July 2024; 19:00	Denmark	34–25	Slovenia	Zlatorog Arena, Celje; Attendance: 895; Referees: D. Loncar, Z. Loncar (CRO)
13 July 2024; 19:00	Pedersen 8	(13–12)	Korže Lesjak 6	Zlatorog Arena, Celje; Attendance: 895; Referees: D. Loncar, Z. Loncar (CRO)
13 July 2024; 19:00	5× (suspension)	Report	1× (yellow card) 6× (suspension)	Zlatorog Arena, Celje; Attendance: 895; Referees: D. Loncar, Z. Loncar (CRO)

=== Group F ===
Pos	Team	Pld	W	D	L	GF	GA	GD	Pts	Qualification
1	Sweden	3	3	0	0	108	65	+43	6	Main round
2	Iceland	3	2	0	1	109	87	+22	4	Main round
3	Poland	3	1	0	2	94	97	−3	2	Intermediate round
4	Ukraine	3	0	0	3	60	122	−62	0	Elimination round

Source: EHF
Rules for classification: 1) points; 2) head-to-head points; 3) head-to-head goal difference; 4) head-to-head number of goals scored; 5) Goal difference.

10 July 2024; 12:00	Iceland	49–22	Ukraine	Tri Lilije Hall, Laško; Attendance: 150; Referees: Maia, Nunes (POR)
10 July 2024; 12:00	Stefánsson 9	(28–13)	Kasai 4	Tri Lilije Hall, Laško; Attendance: 150; Referees: Maia, Nunes (POR)
10 July 2024; 12:00	5× (suspension)	Report	4× (suspension)	Tri Lilije Hall, Laško; Attendance: 150; Referees: Maia, Nunes (POR)

10 July 2024; 16:40	Sweden	38–26	Poland	Tri Lilije Hall, Laško; Attendance: 151; Referees: D. Loncar, Z. Loncar (CRO)
10 July 2024; 16:40	Sundewall 8	(19–10)	Rodak 5	Tri Lilije Hall, Laško; Attendance: 151; Referees: D. Loncar, Z. Loncar (CRO)
10 July 2024; 16:40	1× (yellow card) 6× (suspension)	Report	5× (suspension)	Tri Lilije Hall, Laško; Attendance: 151; Referees: D. Loncar, Z. Loncar (CRO)

11 July 2024; 12:00	Ukraine	16–37	Sweden	Tri Lilije Hall, Laško; Attendance: 52; Referees: Weijmans, Wolbertus (NED)
11 July 2024; 12:00	Kasai, Siryk 4	(6–16)	Montebovi 6	Tri Lilije Hall, Laško; Attendance: 52; Referees: Weijmans, Wolbertus (NED)
11 July 2024; 12:00	3× (suspension)	Report	2× (yellow card) 2× (suspension)	Tri Lilije Hall, Laško; Attendance: 52; Referees: Weijmans, Wolbertus (NED)

11 July 2024; 16:40	Poland	32–37	Iceland	Tri Lilije Hall, Laško; Attendance: 106; Referees: Kull, Tint (EST)
11 July 2024; 16:40	Mielczarski 7	(16–19)	Haraldsson 12	Tri Lilije Hall, Laško; Attendance: 106; Referees: Kull, Tint (EST)
11 July 2024; 16:40	5× (suspension)	Report	1× (yellow card) 6× (suspension)	Tri Lilije Hall, Laško; Attendance: 106; Referees: Kull, Tint (EST)

13 July 2024; 14:20	Poland	36–22	Ukraine	Tri Lilije Hall, Laško; Attendance: 100; Referees: Weber, Weinquin (LUX)
13 July 2024; 14:20	Wasiak 8	(16–8)	Kasai 6	Tri Lilije Hall, Laško; Attendance: 100; Referees: Weber, Weinquin (LUX)
13 July 2024; 14:20	6× (suspension)	Report	2× (yellow card) 10× (suspension)	Tri Lilije Hall, Laško; Attendance: 100; Referees: Weber, Weinquin (LUX)

13 July 2024; 16:40	Sweden	33–23	Iceland	Tri Lilije Hall, Laško; Attendance: 150; Referees: Barysas, Petrusis (LTU)
13 July 2024; 16:40	Månsson 9	(15–12)	Stefánsson 6	Tri Lilije Hall, Laško; Attendance: 150; Referees: Barysas, Petrusis (LTU)
13 July 2024; 16:40	1× (yellow card) 4× (suspension)	Report	1× (yellow card) 3× (suspension)	Tri Lilije Hall, Laško; Attendance: 150; Referees: Barysas, Petrusis (LTU)

=== Ranking of second-placed teams ===
Groups A, B and C

Pos	Grp	Team	Pld	W	D	L	GF	GA	GD	Pts	Qualification
1	B	Germany	3	2	0	1	89	71	+18	4	Main round
2	A	North Macedonia	3	1	2	0	75	65	+10	4	Intermediate round
3	C	France	3	2	0	1	100	100	0	4	Intermediate round

Source: EHF
Rules for classification: 1) points; 2) goal difference; 3) number of goals scored.

Groups D, E and F

Pos	Grp	Team	Pld	W	D	L	GF	GA	GD	Pts	Qualification
1	F	Iceland	3	2	0	1	109	87	+22	4	Main round
2	D	Hungary	3	2	0	1	91	85	+6	4	Intermediate round
3	E	Slovenia (H)	3	2	0	1	96	100	−4	4	Intermediate round

Source: EHF
Rules for classification: 1) points; 2) goal difference; 3) number of goals scored.
(H) Hosts

=== Ranking of third-placed teams ===
Groups A, B and C

Pos	Grp	Team	Pld	W	D	L	GF	GA	GD	Pts	Qualification
1	A	Croatia	3	1	1	1	81	77	+4	3	Intermediate round
2	B	Serbia	3	1	0	2	94	87	+7	2	Intermediate round
3	C	Faroe Islands	3	1	0	2	91	99	−8	2	Elimination round

Source: EHF
Rules for classification: 1) points; 2) goal difference; 3) number of goals scored.

Groups D, E and F

Pos	Grp	Team	Pld	W	D	L	GF	GA	GD	Pts	Qualification
1	F	Poland	3	1	0	2	94	97	−3	2	Intermediate round
2	D	Romania	3	1	0	2	86	99	−13	2	Intermediate round
3	E	Italy	3	1	0	2	86	102	−16	2	Elimination round

Source: EHF
Rules for classification: 1) points; 2) goal difference; 3) number of goals scored.

== Elimination round ==
=== Group E1 ===
Pos	Team	Pld	W	D	L	GF	GA	GD	Pts	Qualification
1	Faroe Islands	3	3	0	0	104	84	+20	6	17–20th place semifinals
2	Czech Republic	3	2	0	1	92	88	+4	4	17–20th place semifinals
3	Israel	3	1	0	2	86	83	+3	2	21–24th place semifinals
4	Ukraine	3	0	0	3	74	101	−27	0	21–24th place semifinals

Source: EHF
Rules for classification: 1) points; 2) head-to-head points; 3) head-to-head goal difference; 4) head-to-head number of goals scored; 5) Goal difference.

15 July 2024; 12:00	Faroe Islands	36–29	Israel	Golovec Hall, Celje; Referees: Kull, Tint (EST)
15 July 2024; 12:00	Mittún 10	(19–14)	Pelach 7	Golovec Hall, Celje; Referees: Kull, Tint (EST)
15 July 2024; 12:00	2× (suspension)	Report	1× (yellow card) 6× (suspension)	Golovec Hall, Celje; Referees: Kull, Tint (EST)

15 July 2024; 14:20	Czech Republic	36–28	Ukraine	Golovec Hall, Celje; Referees: Hummelgard Svensson (SWE)
15 July 2024; 14:20	Erebai, Ogoun 5	(19–12)	Siryk 6	Golovec Hall, Celje; Referees: Hummelgard Svensson (SWE)
15 July 2024; 14:20	4× (suspension)	Report	4× (suspension)	Golovec Hall, Celje; Referees: Hummelgard Svensson (SWE)

16 July 2024; 12:00	Ukraine	27–35	Faroe Islands	Golovec Hall, Celje; Referees: D. Loncar, Z. Loncar (CRO)
16 July 2024; 12:00	Protsiuk 9	(15–16)	Vedelsbøl, Mittún 6	Golovec Hall, Celje; Referees: D. Loncar, Z. Loncar (CRO)
16 July 2024; 12:00	6× (suspension)	Report	2× (suspension)	Golovec Hall, Celje; Referees: D. Loncar, Z. Loncar (CRO)

16 July 2024; 14:20	Israel	27–28	Czech Republic	Golovec Hall, Celje; Referees: Weber, Weinquin (LUX)
16 July 2024; 14:20	Sharon 5	(12–17)	Bláha 7	Golovec Hall, Celje; Referees: Weber, Weinquin (LUX)
16 July 2024; 14:20	3× (suspension)	Report	4× (suspension)	Golovec Hall, Celje; Referees: Weber, Weinquin (LUX)

18 July 2024; 12:00	Faroe Islands	33–28	Czech Republic	Golovec Hall, Celje; Referees: Puksic, Satler (SLO)
18 July 2024; 12:00	Mittún 10	(17–12)	Duda 7	Golovec Hall, Celje; Referees: Puksic, Satler (SLO)
18 July 2024; 12:00	5× (suspension) 1× (red card)	Report	5× (suspension)	Golovec Hall, Celje; Referees: Puksic, Satler (SLO)

18 July 2024; 14:20	Israel	30–19	Ukraine	Golovec Hall, Celje; Referees: Hummelgard, Svensson (SWE)
18 July 2024; 14:20	Resch-Erman 5	(17–12)	Protsiuk 10	Golovec Hall, Celje; Referees: Hummelgard, Svensson (SWE)
18 July 2024; 14:20	1× (yellow card) 2× (suspension)	Report	3× (suspension)	Golovec Hall, Celje; Referees: Hummelgard, Svensson (SWE)

=== Group E2 ===
Pos	Team	Pld	W	D	L	GF	GA	GD	Pts	Qualification
1	Switzerland	3	3	0	0	118	67	+51	6	17–20th place semifinals
2	Italy	3	1	1	1	96	92	+4	3	17–20th place semifinals
3	Greece	3	1	1	1	83	92	−9	3	21–24th place semifinals
4	Montenegro	3	0	0	3	64	110	−46	0	21–24th place semifinals

Source: EHF
Rules for classification: 1) points; 2) head-to-head points; 3) head-to-head goal difference; 4) head-to-head number of goals scored; 5) Goal difference.

15 July 2024; 16:40	Italy	39–26	Montenegro	Golovec Hall, Celje; Referees: Weber, Weinquin (LUX)
15 July 2024; 16:40	Urbaz, Koltes 5	(20–11)	Kovacevic 8	Golovec Hall, Celje; Referees: Weber, Weinquin (LUX)
15 July 2024; 16:40	2× (suspension)	Report	2× (suspension)	Golovec Hall, Celje; Referees: Weber, Weinquin (LUX)

15 July 2024; 19:00	Switzerland	40–24	Greece	Golovec Hall, Celje; Referees: Puskic, Sattler (SLO)
15 July 2024; 19:00	Sarlos 7	(16–10)	Hatsatourian 7	Golovec Hall, Celje; Referees: Puskic, Sattler (SLO)
15 July 2024; 19:00	1× (suspension)	Report	6× (suspension)	Golovec Hall, Celje; Referees: Puskic, Sattler (SLO)

16 July 2024; 16:40	Greece	27–27	Italy	Golovec Hall, Celje; Referees: Mandak, Rudinsky (SVK)
16 July 2024; 16:40	Batis 11	(12–8)	Angelis, Manojlovic 7	Golovec Hall, Celje; Referees: Mandak, Rudinsky (SVK)
16 July 2024; 16:40	4× (suspension)	Report	1× (suspension)	Golovec Hall, Celje; Referees: Mandak, Rudinsky (SVK)

16 July 2024; 19:00	Montenegro	13–39	Switzerland	Golovec Hall, Celje; Referees: Hummelgard, Svensson (SWE)
16 July 2024; 19:00	Bakic 5	(6–16)	Sarlos 8	Golovec Hall, Celje; Referees: Hummelgard, Svensson (SWE)
16 July 2024; 19:00	4× (suspension) 1× (red card)	Report	2× (suspension)	Golovec Hall, Celje; Referees: Hummelgard, Svensson (SWE)

18 July 2024; 16:40	Italy	30–39	Switzerland	Golovec Hall, Celje; Referees: D. Loncar, Z. Loncar (CRO)
18 July 2024; 16:40	Manojlovic 8	(17–17)	Wolfisberg 8	Golovec Hall, Celje; Referees: D. Loncar, Z. Loncar (CRO)
18 July 2024; 16:40	1× (yellow card) 6× (suspension)	Report	2× (suspension)	Golovec Hall, Celje; Referees: D. Loncar, Z. Loncar (CRO)

18 July 2024; 19:00	Montenegro	25–32	Greece	Golovec Hall, Celje; Referees: Petursson, Tharstarson (ISL)
18 July 2024; 19:00	Bakic 10	(9–17)	Rousos 6	Golovec Hall, Celje; Referees: Petursson, Tharstarson (ISL)
18 July 2024; 19:00	1× (yellow card) 2× (suspension)	Report	2× (suspension)	Golovec Hall, Celje; Referees: Petursson, Tharstarson (ISL)

== Intermediate round ==
=== Group I1 ===
Pos	Team	Pld	W	D	L	GF	GA	GD	Pts	Qualification
1	France	3	3	0	0	96	70	+26	6	9–12th place semifinals
2	North Macedonia	3	2	0	1	77	77	0	4	9–12th place semifinals
3	Romania	3	1	0	2	83	91	−8	2	13–16th place semifinals
4	Poland	3	0	0	3	83	101	−18	0	13–16th place semifinals

Source: EHF
Rules for classification: 1) points; 2) head-to-head points; 3) head-to-head goal difference; 4) head-to-head number of goals scored; 5) Goal difference.

15 July 2024; 12:00	North Macedonia	28–26	Poland	Tri Lilije Hall, Laško; Referees: D. Loncar, Z. Loncar (CRO)
15 July 2024; 12:00	three players 4	(15–14)	Zyszkiewicz 6	Tri Lilije Hall, Laško; Referees: D. Loncar, Z. Loncar (CRO)
15 July 2024; 12:00	5× (suspension)	Report	6× (suspension) 1× (red card)	Tri Lilije Hall, Laško; Referees: D. Loncar, Z. Loncar (CRO)

15 July 2024; 14:20	France	30–25	Romania	Tri Lilije Hall, Laško; Referees: Barysas, Petrusis (LTU)
15 July 2024; 14:20	Simonnet 5	(15–13)	Stanciuc 6	Tri Lilije Hall, Laško; Referees: Barysas, Petrusis (LTU)
15 July 2024; 14:20	1× (yellow card) 4× (suspension)	Report	1× (yellow card) 4× (suspension)	Tri Lilije Hall, Laško; Referees: Barysas, Petrusis (LTU)

16 July 2024; 12:00	Romania	26–31	North Macedonia	Tri Lilije Hall, Laško; Referees: Lohsak, Novikov (UKR)
16 July 2024; 12:00	Sabou 5	(15–15)	Uzunchev 7	Tri Lilije Hall, Laško; Referees: Lohsak, Novikov (UKR)
16 July 2024; 12:00	3× (suspension)	Report	1× (yellow card) 5× (suspension)	Tri Lilije Hall, Laško; Referees: Lohsak, Novikov (UKR)

16 July 2024; 14:20	Poland	27–41	France	Tri Lilije Hall, Laško; Referees: Puksic, Satler (SLO)
16 July 2024; 14:20	Wasiak 6	(10–17)	Tighiouart 11	Tri Lilije Hall, Laško; Referees: Puksic, Satler (SLO)
16 July 2024; 14:20	4× (suspension)	Report	3× (suspension) 1× (red card)	Tri Lilije Hall, Laško; Referees: Puksic, Satler (SLO)

18 July 2024; 12:00	North Macedonia	18–25	France	Tri Lilije Hall, Laško; Referees: Ivanovic, Vujisic (MNE)
18 July 2024; 12:00	four players 3	(10–12)	Karamoko 4	Tri Lilije Hall, Laško; Referees: Ivanovic, Vujisic (MNE)
18 July 2024; 12:00	1× (yellow card) 3× (suspension)	Report	3× (suspension)	Tri Lilije Hall, Laško; Referees: Ivanovic, Vujisic (MNE)

18 July 2024; 14:20	Poland	30–32	Romania	Tri Lilije Hall, Laško; Referees: Weijmans, Wolbertus (NED)
18 July 2024; 14:20	Rodak 7	(15–9)	Stanciuc 6	Tri Lilije Hall, Laško; Referees: Weijmans, Wolbertus (NED)
18 July 2024; 14:20	2× (suspension)	Report	1× (yellow card) 2× (suspension)	Tri Lilije Hall, Laško; Referees: Weijmans, Wolbertus (NED)

=== Group I2 ===
Pos	Team	Pld	W	D	L	GF	GA	GD	Pts	Qualification
1	Hungary	3	2	1	0	83	79	+4	5	9–12th place semifinals
2	Croatia	3	2	0	1	84	81	+3	4	9–12th place semifinals
3	Slovenia	3	1	1	1	89	83	+6	3	13–16th place semifinals
4	Serbia	3	0	0	3	78	91	−13	0	13–16th place semifinals

Updated to match(es) played on 15 July 2024. Source: EHF
Rules for classification: 1) points; 2) head-to-head points; 3) head-to-head goal difference; 4) head-to-head number of goals scored; 5) Goal difference.

15 July 2024; 16:40	Slovenia	34–26	Serbia	Tri Lilije Hall, Laško; Referees: Weijmans, Wolbertus (NED)
15 July 2024; 16:40	Zajc 9	(14–12)	Mitrovic 7	Tri Lilije Hall, Laško; Referees: Weijmans, Wolbertus (NED)
15 July 2024; 16:40	3× (suspension)	Report	1× (yellow card) 2× (suspension)	Tri Lilije Hall, Laško; Referees: Weijmans, Wolbertus (NED)

15 July 2024; 19:40	Hungary	28–25	Croatia	Tri Lilije Hall, Laško; Referees: Petursson, Thrastason (ISL)
15 July 2024; 19:40	Kathi, Molnár 6	(14–9)	Borovec 7	Tri Lilije Hall, Laško; Referees: Petursson, Thrastason (ISL)
15 July 2024; 19:40	1× (yellow card) 3× (suspension)	Report	1× (yellow card) 7× (suspension) 1× (red card)	Tri Lilije Hall, Laško; Referees: Petursson, Thrastason (ISL)

16 July 2024; 16:40	Croatia	28–26	Slovenia	Tri Lilije Hall, Laško; Referees: Ivanovic, Vujisic (MNE)
16 July 2024; 16:40	Capric 8	(11–14)	Zajc 7	Tri Lilije Hall, Laško; Referees: Ivanovic, Vujisic (MNE)
16 July 2024; 16:40	1× (yellow card) 4× (suspension)	Report	6× (suspension)	Tri Lilije Hall, Laško; Referees: Ivanovic, Vujisic (MNE)

16 July 2024; 19:00	Serbia	25–26	Hungary	Tri Lilije Hall, Laško; Referees: Merisi, Pepe (ITA)
16 July 2024; 19:00	Mitrovic 7	(14–8)	Kathi 5	Tri Lilije Hall, Laško; Referees: Merisi, Pepe (ITA)
16 July 2024; 19:00	3× (yellow card) 6× (suspension) 1× (red card)	Report	1× (yellow card) 6× (suspension)	Tri Lilije Hall, Laško; Referees: Merisi, Pepe (ITA)

18 July 2024; 16:40	Croatia	31–27	Serbia	Tri Lilije Hall, Laško; Referees: Loshak, Novikov (UKR)
18 July 2024; 16:40	Tomšic, Malinarich 7	(17–12)	Feješ 7	Tri Lilije Hall, Laško; Referees: Loshak, Novikov (UKR)
18 July 2024; 16:40	1× (yellow card) 4× (suspension)	Report	1× (yellow card) 2× (suspension)	Tri Lilije Hall, Laško; Referees: Loshak, Novikov (UKR)

18 July 2024; 19:00	Hungary	29–29	Slovenia	Tri Lilije Hall, Laško; Referees: Maia, Nunes (POR)
18 July 2024; 19:00	Terjek 8	(17–13)	Zajc 8	Tri Lilije Hall, Laško; Referees: Maia, Nunes (POR)
18 July 2024; 19:00	1× (yellow card) 2× (suspension)	Report	1× (yellow card) 2× (suspension) 1× (red card)	Tri Lilije Hall, Laško; Referees: Maia, Nunes (POR)

== Main round ==
=== Group M1 ===
Pos	Team	Pld	W	D	L	GF	GA	GD	Pts	Qualification
1	Portugal	3	2	1	0	102	93	+9	5	Semifinals
2	Spain	3	2	0	1	111	94	+17	4	Semifinals
3	Austria	3	1	0	2	83	94	−11	2	5–8th place semifinals
4	Iceland	3	0	1	2	89	104	−15	1	5–8th place semifinals

Source: EHF
Rules for classification: 1) points; 2) head-to-head points; 3) head-to-head goal difference; 4) head-to-head number of goals scored; 5) Goal difference.

15 July 2024; 12:00	Austria	26–37	Spain	Zlatorog Arena, Celje; Referees: Ivanovic, Vujisic (MNE)
15 July 2024; 12:00	Paulnsteiner 4	(14–22)	Romero Holguin 8	Zlatorog Arena, Celje; Referees: Ivanovic, Vujisic (MNE)
15 July 2024; 12:00	4× (suspension)	Report	1× (yellow card) 2× (suspension)	Zlatorog Arena, Celje; Referees: Ivanovic, Vujisic (MNE)

15 July 2024; 14:20	Portugal	33–33	Iceland	Zlatorog Arena, Celje; Referees: Mandak, Rudinsky (SVK)
15 July 2024; 14:20	Correia, De Campos 7	(17–15)	Erlingsson 7	Zlatorog Arena, Celje; Referees: Mandak, Rudinsky (SVK)
15 July 2024; 14:20	1× (yellow card) 7× (suspension)	Report	7× (suspension)	Zlatorog Arena, Celje; Referees: Mandak, Rudinsky (SVK)

16 July 2024; 12:00	Iceland	26–34	Austria	Zlatorog Arena, Celje; Referees: I. Covalciuc, A. Covalciuc (MDA)
16 July 2024; 12:00	Haraldsson 5	(10–16)	Schnürch, Kofler 7	Zlatorog Arena, Celje; Referees: I. Covalciuc, A. Covalciuc (MDA)
16 July 2024; 12:00	3× (suspension)	Report	2× (suspension)	Zlatorog Arena, Celje; Referees: I. Covalciuc, A. Covalciuc (MDA)

16 July 2024; 14:20	Spain	37–38	Portugal	Zlatorog Arena, Celje; Referees: Weijmans, Wolbertus (NED)
16 July 2024; 14:20	Castillo Oliveras 8	(17–19)	Oliviera, Brandão 9	Zlatorog Arena, Celje; Referees: Weijmans, Wolbertus (NED)
16 July 2024; 14:20	1× (yellow card) 7× (suspension) 1× (red card)	Report	7× (suspension)	Zlatorog Arena, Celje; Referees: Weijmans, Wolbertus (NED)

18 July 2024; 12:00	Austria	23–31	Portugal	Zlatorog Arena, Celje; Referees: Kull, Tint (EST)
18 July 2024; 12:00	Möstl 6	(12–15)	M. Oliviera, N. Oliviera 6	Zlatorog Arena, Celje; Referees: Kull, Tint (EST)
18 July 2024; 12:00	5× (suspension)	Report	5× (suspension) 1× (red card)	Zlatorog Arena, Celje; Referees: Kull, Tint (EST)

18 July 2024; 14:20	Spain	37–30	Iceland	Zlatorog Arena, Celje; Referees: Barysas, Petrusis (LTU)
18 July 2024; 14:20	Romero Holguin 11	(18–16)	Stefánsson 11	Zlatorog Arena, Celje; Referees: Barysas, Petrusis (LTU)
18 July 2024; 14:20	1× (yellow card) 3× (suspension)	Report	1× (yellow card) 6× (suspension)	Zlatorog Arena, Celje; Referees: Barysas, Petrusis (LTU)

=== Group M2 ===
Pos	Team	Pld	W	D	L	GF	GA	GD	Pts	Qualification
1	Denmark	3	2	0	1	95	87	+8	4	Semifinals
2	Germany	3	1	1	1	80	81	−1	3	Semifinals
3	Sweden	3	1	1	1	91	93	−2	3	5–8th place semifinals
4	Norway	3	1	0	2	87	92	−5	2	5–8th place semifinals

Source: EHF
Rules for classification: 1) points; 2) head-to-head points; 3) head-to-head goal difference; 4) head-to-head number of goals scored; 5) Goal difference.

15 July 2024; 16:40	Norway	37–34	Sweden	Zlatorog Arena, Celje; Referees: Merisi, Pepe (ITA)
15 July 2024; 16:40	Anderson 11	(15–15)	Månsson 8	Zlatorog Arena, Celje; Referees: Merisi, Pepe (ITA)
15 July 2024; 16:40	1× (yellow card) 5× (suspension)	Report	3× (suspension)	Zlatorog Arena, Celje; Referees: Merisi, Pepe (ITA)

15 July 2024; 19:00	Denmark	33–28	Germany	Zlatorog Arena, Celje; Referees: Maia, Nunes (POR)
15 July 2024; 19:00	Lykke, Pedersen 7	(16–15)	Schmidt 5	Zlatorog Arena, Celje; Referees: Maia, Nunes (POR)
15 July 2024; 19:00	1× (suspension)	Report	2× (suspension)	Zlatorog Arena, Celje; Referees: Maia, Nunes (POR)

16 July 2024; 16:40	Sweden	30–29	Denmark	Zlatorog Arena, Celje; Referees: Petursson, Thrastarson (ISL)
16 July 2024; 16:40	Månsson 10	(16–14)	Vilhelmsen 6	Zlatorog Arena, Celje; Referees: Petursson, Thrastarson (ISL)
16 July 2024; 16:40	1× (yellow card) 8× (suspension) 1× (red card)	Report	1× (yellow card) 4× (suspension)	Zlatorog Arena, Celje; Referees: Petursson, Thrastarson (ISL)

16 July 2024; 19:00	Germany	25–21	Norway	Zlatorog Arena, Celje; Referees: Barysas, Petrusis (LTU)
16 July 2024; 19:00	Móré 6	(11–10)	Anderson 6	Zlatorog Arena, Celje; Referees: Barysas, Petrusis (LTU)
16 July 2024; 19:00	2× (suspension)	Report	1× (yellow card) 6× (suspension) 1× (red card)	Zlatorog Arena, Celje; Referees: Barysas, Petrusis (LTU)

18 July 2024; 16:40	Norway	29–33	Denmark	Zlatorog Arena, Celje; Referees: Mandak, Rudinsky (SVK)
18 July 2024; 16:40	Solheim 12	(16–17)	Pedersen 10	Zlatorog Arena, Celje; Referees: Mandak, Rudinsky (SVK)
18 July 2024; 16:40	8× (suspension)	Report	1× (yellow card) 4× (suspension)	Zlatorog Arena, Celje; Referees: Mandak, Rudinsky (SVK)

18 July 2024; 19:00	Sweden	27–27	Germany	Zlatorog Arena, Celje; Referees: I. Colvalciuc, A. Covalciuc (MDA)
18 July 2024; 19:00	Månsson 6	(15–16)	Móré, Schmidt 6	Zlatorog Arena, Celje; Referees: I. Colvalciuc, A. Covalciuc (MDA)
18 July 2024; 19:00	2× (suspension)	Report	2× (suspension)	Zlatorog Arena, Celje; Referees: I. Colvalciuc, A. Covalciuc (MDA)

== Placement round ==
=== Bracket ===
21st place bracket

21–24th place semifinals
19 July
Israel	27
Montenegro	23
19 July
Greece	21
Ukraine	23

21st place
20 July
Israel	32
Ukraine	24
23rd place
20 July
Montenegro	32
Greece	35

=== 21–24th place semifinals ===
19 July 2024; 14:20	Israel	27–23	Montenegro	Golovec Hall, Celje; Referees: Barysas, Petrusis (LTU)
19 July 2024; 14:20	Sharon 6	(16–9)	Bulatović, Radovanović 5	Golovec Hall, Celje; Referees: Barysas, Petrusis (LTU)
19 July 2024; 14:20	4× (suspension)	Report	1× (yellow card) 4× (suspension) 1× (red card)	Golovec Hall, Celje; Referees: Barysas, Petrusis (LTU)

19 July 2024; 16:40	Greece	21–23	Ukraine	Golovec Hall, Celje; Referees: Weber, Weinquin (LUX)
19 July 2024; 16:40	Batis 6	(9–9)	Protsiuk 10	Golovec Hall, Celje; Referees: Weber, Weinquin (LUX)
19 July 2024; 16:40	1× (yellow card) 7× (suspension)	Report	5× (suspension)	Golovec Hall, Celje; Referees: Weber, Weinquin (LUX)

=== 23rd place game ===
20 July 2024; 12:00	Montenegro	32–35	Greece	Golovec Hall, Celje; Referees: Maia, Nunes (POR)
20 July 2024; 12:00	Radovanović 9	(20–18)	Batis 11	Golovec Hall, Celje; Referees: Maia, Nunes (POR)
20 July 2024; 12:00	2× (suspension) 1× (red card)	Report	2× (suspension)	Golovec Hall, Celje; Referees: Maia, Nunes (POR)

=== 21st place game ===
20 July 2024; 14:20	Israel	32–24	Ukraine	Golovec Hall, Celje; Referees: Hummelgard, Svensson (SWE)
20 July 2024; 14:20	Gonen 5	(16–15)	Protsiuk, Zabolotnii 6	Golovec Hall, Celje; Referees: Hummelgard, Svensson (SWE)
20 July 2024; 14:20	1× (yellow card) 2× (suspension)	Report	2× (suspension)	Golovec Hall, Celje; Referees: Hummelgard, Svensson (SWE)

17st place bracket

17–20th place semifinals
19 July
Faroe Islands	42
Italy	26
19 July
Switzerland	39
Czech Republic	33

17th place
20 July
Faroe Islands	32
Switzerland	35
19rd place
20 July
Czech Republic	35
Italy	33

=== 17–20th place semifinals ===
19 July 2024; 12:00	Switzerland	39–33	Czech Republic	Golovec Hall, Celje; Referees: Merisi, Pepe (ITA)
19 July 2024; 12:00	Wolfisberg 7	(16–15)	Erebai 6	Golovec Hall, Celje; Referees: Merisi, Pepe (ITA)
19 July 2024; 12:00	1× (yellow card)	Report	6× (suspension)	Golovec Hall, Celje; Referees: Merisi, Pepe (ITA)

19 July 2024; 19:00	Faroe Islands	42–26	Italy	Golovec Hall, Celje; Referees: Hummelgard, Svensson (SWE)
19 July 2024; 19:00	Vedelsbøl 8	(23–12)	Manojlovic 5	Golovec Hall, Celje; Referees: Hummelgard, Svensson (SWE)
19 July 2024; 19:00	2× (suspension)	Report	2× (suspension)	Golovec Hall, Celje; Referees: Hummelgard, Svensson (SWE)

=== 19th place game ===
20 July 2024; 16:40	Czech Republic	35–33	Italy	Golovec Hall, Celje; Referees: Loncar, Loncar (CRO)
20 July 2024; 16:40	De Angelis 13	(18–14)	Pšenica 7	Golovec Hall, Celje; Referees: Loncar, Loncar (CRO)
20 July 2024; 16:40	1× (yellow card) 4× (suspension)	Report	4× (suspension)	Golovec Hall, Celje; Referees: Loncar, Loncar (CRO)

=== 17th place game ===
20 July 2024; 19:00	Faroe Islands	32–35	Switzerland	Golovec Hall, Celje; Referees: Weber, Weinquin (LUX)
20 July 2024; 19:00	Mittún 12	(19–17)	Sigrist, Wolfisberg 9	Golovec Hall, Celje; Referees: Weber, Weinquin (LUX)
20 July 2024; 19:00	3× (suspension)	Report	2× (suspension)	Golovec Hall, Celje; Referees: Weber, Weinquin (LUX)

13th place bracket

13–16th place semifinals
19 July
Romania	29
Serbia	31
19 July
Slovenia	29
Poland	33

13th place
20 July
Serbia	27
Poland	25
15th place
20 July
Romania	30
Slovenia	31

=== 13–16th place semifinals ===
19 July 2024; 12:00	Romania	29–31	Serbia	Tri Lilije Hall, Laško; Referees: Kull, Tint (EST)
19 July 2024; 12:00	Stanciuc 9	(15–15)	Cabrilo, Feješ 5	Tri Lilije Hall, Laško; Referees: Kull, Tint (EST)
19 July 2024; 12:00	1× (yellow card) 4× (suspension)	Report	2× (suspension)	Tri Lilije Hall, Laško; Referees: Kull, Tint (EST)

19 July 2024; 19:00	Slovenia	29–33	Poland	Tri Lilije Hall, Laško; Referees: Loshak, Novikov (UKR)
19 July 2024; 19:00	Korže Lesjak 9	(15–18)	Sladkowski 7	Tri Lilije Hall, Laško; Referees: Loshak, Novikov (UKR)
19 July 2024; 19:00	2× (suspension)	Report	2× (suspension)	Tri Lilije Hall, Laško; Referees: Loshak, Novikov (UKR)

=== 15th place game ===
20 July 2024; 16:40	Romania	30–31	Slovenia	Golovec Hall, Celje; Referees: Mandak, Rudinsky (SVK)
20 July 2024; 16:40	three players 5	(13–17)	Marguc 11	Golovec Hall, Celje; Referees: Mandak, Rudinsky (SVK)
20 July 2024; 16:40	1× (yellow card) 3× (suspension)	Report	3× (suspension)	Golovec Hall, Celje; Referees: Mandak, Rudinsky (SVK)

=== 13th place game ===
20 July 2024; 19:00	Serbia	27–25	Poland	Golovec Hall, Celje; Referees: Puksic, Salter (SLO)
20 July 2024; 19:00	Sijan 11	(15–13)	Peplinski, Wieligucki 5	Golovec Hall, Celje; Referees: Puksic, Salter (SLO)
20 July 2024; 19:00	2× (suspension)	Report	2× (suspension)	Golovec Hall, Celje; Referees: Puksic, Salter (SLO)

9th place bracket

9th–12th place semifinals
19 July
France	29
Croatia	26
19 July
Hungary	26
North Macedonia	27

9th place
21 July
France	29
North Macedonia	30
11th place
21 July
Croatia	29
Hungary	20

=== 9–12th place semifinals ===
19 July 2024; 14:20	Hungary	26–27	North Macedonia	Tri Lilije Hall, Laško; Referees: Petursson, Thrastarson (ISL)
19 July 2024; 14:20	Gazsó 5	(16–14)	Uzunchev 8	Tri Lilije Hall, Laško; Referees: Petursson, Thrastarson (ISL)
19 July 2024; 14:20	5× (suspension)	Report	1× (yellow card) 9× (suspension)	Tri Lilije Hall, Laško; Referees: Petursson, Thrastarson (ISL)

19 July 2024; 16:40	France	29–26	Croatia	Tri Lilije Hall, Laško; Referees: Weijmans, Wolbertus (NED)
19 July 2024; 16:40	Favril, Tighiouart 6	(12–15)	Čaprić 7	Tri Lilije Hall, Laško; Referees: Weijmans, Wolbertus (NED)
19 July 2024; 16:40	1× (yellow card) 6× (suspension)	Report	1× (yellow card) 6× (suspension) 1× (red card)	Tri Lilije Hall, Laško; Referees: Weijmans, Wolbertus (NED)

=== 11th place game ===
21 July 2024; 12:00	Croatia	29–20	Hungary	Golovec Hall, Celje; Referees: Loshak, Novikov (UKR)
21 July 2024; 12:00	Frankovic 7	(16–10)	three players 4	Golovec Hall, Celje; Referees: Loshak, Novikov (UKR)
21 July 2024; 12:00	1× (yellow card) 4× (suspension)	Report	6× (suspension)	Golovec Hall, Celje; Referees: Loshak, Novikov (UKR)

=== 9th place game ===
21 July 2024; 14:20	France	29–30	North Macedonia	Golovec Hall, Celje; Referees: Merisi, Pepe (ITA)
21 July 2024; 14:20	Tighiouart 6	(10–15)	Subashevski, Mitev 6	Golovec Hall, Celje; Referees: Merisi, Pepe (ITA)
21 July 2024; 14:20	1× (yellow card) 2× (suspension)	Report	1× (yellow card) 7× (suspension) 1× (red card)	Golovec Hall, Celje; Referees: Merisi, Pepe (ITA)

5th place bracket

5–8th place semifinals
19 July
Austria	30
Norway	22
19 July
Sweden	30
Iceland	27

5th place
20 July
Austria	26
Sweden	34
7th place
20 July
Norway	29
Iceland	32

=== 5–8th place semifinals ===
19 July 2024; 12:00	Austria	30–22	Norway	Golovec Hall, Celje; Referees: Maia, Nunes (POR)
19 July 2024; 12:00	Meleschnig, Möstl 4	(14–10)	Oftedal, Soløst 4	Golovec Hall, Celje; Referees: Maia, Nunes (POR)
19 July 2024; 12:00	3× (suspension)	Report	2× (suspension)	Golovec Hall, Celje; Referees: Maia, Nunes (POR)

19 July 2024; 14:20	Sweden	30–27	Iceland	Golovec Hall, Celje; Referees: Mandak, Rudinsky (SVK)
19 July 2024; 14:20	Segertoft 8	(18–13)	Elísson, Stefánsson 5	Golovec Hall, Celje; Referees: Mandak, Rudinsky (SVK)
19 July 2024; 14:20	1× (yellow card) 5× (suspension)	Report	2× (yellow card) 4× (suspension)	Golovec Hall, Celje; Referees: Mandak, Rudinsky (SVK)

=== 7th place game ===
21 July 2024; 12:00	Norway	29–32	Iceland	Golovec Hall, Celje; Referees: Weijmans, Wolbertus (NED)
21 July 2024; 12:00	Anderson 11	(16–18)	Stefánsson 11	Golovec Hall, Celje; Referees: Weijmans, Wolbertus (NED)
21 July 2024; 12:00	3× (suspension)	Report	1× (yellow card) 4× (suspension)	Golovec Hall, Celje; Referees: Weijmans, Wolbertus (NED)

=== 5th place game ===
21 July 2024; 14:20	Austria	26–34	Sweden	Golovec Hall, Celje; Referees: Kull, Tint (EST)
21 July 2024; 14:20	Möstl 6	(11–16)	Månsson 8	Golovec Hall, Celje; Referees: Kull, Tint (EST)
21 July 2024; 14:20	4× (suspension)	Report	1× (suspension)	Golovec Hall, Celje; Referees: Kull, Tint (EST)

== Knockout stage ==
Semifinals
19 July
Portugal	29
Germany	24
19 July
Denmark	34
Spain	36

Final
21 July
Portugal	31
Spain	35
Third place
21 July
Germany	23
Denmark	26

=== Semifinals ===
19 July 2024; 18:00	Denmark	34–36	Spain	Zlatorog Arena, Celje; Referees: I. Colvalciuc, A. Covalciuc (MDA)
19 July 2024; 18:00	Pedersen 8	(18–17)	Castillo Oliveras 9	Zlatorog Arena, Celje; Referees: I. Colvalciuc, A. Covalciuc (MDA)
19 July 2024; 18:00	1× (yellow card) 2× (suspension)	Report	4× (suspension)	Zlatorog Arena, Celje; Referees: I. Colvalciuc, A. Covalciuc (MDA)

19 July 2024; 20:30	Portugal	29–24	Germany	Zlatorog Arena, Celje; Referees: Ivanovic, Vujisic (MNE)
19 July 2024; 20:30	three players 4	(18–12)	Móré 8	Zlatorog Arena, Celje; Referees: Ivanovic, Vujisic (MNE)
19 July 2024; 20:30	1× (yellow card) 2× (suspension)	Report	3× (suspension)	Zlatorog Arena, Celje; Referees: Ivanovic, Vujisic (MNE)

=== Third place game ===
21 July 2024; 18:00	Germany	23–26	Denmark	Zlatorog Arena, Celje; Referees: Petursson, Thrastarson (ISL)
21 July 2024; 18:00	Schmidt 7	(11–15)	Lauridsen 7	Zlatorog Arena, Celje; Referees: Petursson, Thrastarson (ISL)
21 July 2024; 18:00	2× (suspension)	Report	1× (suspension)	Zlatorog Arena, Celje; Referees: Petursson, Thrastarson (ISL)

=== Final ===
21 July 2024; 20:30	Portugal	31–35	Spain	Zlatorog Arena, Celje; Referees: Barysas, Petrusis (LTU)
21 July 2024; 20:30	Oliviera 11	(13–20)	Castillo Oliveras 11	Zlatorog Arena, Celje; Referees: Barysas, Petrusis (LTU)
21 July 2024; 20:30	4× (suspension)	Report	1× (yellow card) 2× (suspension)	Zlatorog Arena, Celje; Referees: Barysas, Petrusis (LTU)

== Final ranking ==
Rank	Team
1st place, gold medalist(s)	Spain
2nd place, silver medalist(s)	Portugal
3rd place, bronze medalist(s)	Denmark
4	Germany
5	Sweden
6	Austria
7	Iceland
8	Norway
9	North Macedonia
10	France
11	Croatia
12	Hungary
13	Serbia
14	Poland
15	Slovenia
16	Romania
17	Switzerland
18	Faroe Islands
19	Czech Republic
20	Italy
21	Israel
22	Ukraine
23	Greece
24	Montenegro

Team qualified for the 2025 Men's Junior World Handball Championship
Team qualified for the 2025 Men's Junior World Handball Championship as a host nation

2024 Men's U-20 EHF Championship

Rank	Team
1st place, gold medalist(s)	Slovakia
2nd place, silver medalist(s)	Latvia
3rd place, bronze medalist(s)	Finland
4	Luxembourg
5	Estonia
6	Turkey
7	Lithuania
8	Kosovo
9	Belgium
10	Georgia
11	Great Britain
12	Bulgaria

== Marketing ==
Tickets are priced at 12 Euros (10 Euros if ordered in advance) for a day ticket and 30 Euros (25 Euros if ordered in advance) from a family package.

== See also ==
- 2024 European Men's U-18 Handball Championship
- 2024 Men's U-18 EHF Championship I
- 2024 Men's U-18 EHF Championship II
- 2024 Men's U-20 EHF Championship
- 2025 IHF Men's U19 Handball World Championship
- 2025 IHF Men's U21 Handball World Championship
