= North Macedonia men's national junior handball team =

North Macedonia

Information
- Nickname: Црвено-жолти (The Red-Yellows)
- Association: Macedonian Handball Federation
- Coach: Ilija Temelkovski

Colours
1st	2nd

Results

IHF U-21 World Championship
- Appearances: 4 (First in 1997)
- Best result: 6th place (2017)

European Junior Championship
- Appearances: 7 (First in 2000)
- Best result: 4th place (2002)
- Last updated on Unknown.

The North Macedonia national junior handball team is the national under–20 Handball team of North Macedonia, representing North Macedonia in international matches.

== History ==
=== IHF Junior World Championship record ===
Champions Runners up Third place Fourth place

Year	Round	Position	GP	W	D	L	GS	GA	GD
1977 (Sweden)	Didn't Qualify								
1979 (Sweden) / (Denmark)	Didn't Qualify								
1981 (Portugal)	Didn't Qualify								
1983 (Finland)	Didn't Qualify								
1985 (Italy)	Didn't Qualify								
1987 (Socialist Federal Republic of Yugoslavia)	Didn't Qualify								
1989 (Spain)	Didn't Qualify								
1991 (Greece)	Didn't Qualify								
1993 (Egypt)	Didn't Qualify								
1995 (Argentina)	Didn't Qualify								
1997 (Turkey)		15th place							
1999 (Qatar)	Didn't Qualify								
2001 (Switzerland)	Didn't Qualify								
2003 (Brazil)	Didn't Qualify								
2005 (Hungary)	Didn't Qualify								
2007 (North Macedonia)		10th place							
2009 (Egypt)	Didn't Qualify								
2011 (Greece)	Didn't Qualify								
2013 (Bosnia and Herzegovina)	Didn't Qualify								
2015 (Brazil)	Didn't Qualify								
2017 (Algeria)		6th place							
2019 (Spain)	Didn't Qualify								
2023 (Germany) (Greece)	Didn't Qualify								
2025 (Poland)		25th place							
Total	4/25	0 Titles							

=== European Championship ===
Champions Runners up Third place Fourth place

European Junior Championship record
Year	Round	Position	GP	W	D	L	GS	GA	GD
(Romania) 1996	Didn't Qualify								
(Austria) 1998	Didn't Qualify								
(Greece) 2000		9th place							
(Poland) 2002	Semi-finals	4th place							
(Latvia) 2004		15th place							
(Austria) 2006	Didn't Qualify								
(Romania) 2008	Didn't Qualify								
(Slovakia) 2010	Didn't Qualify								
(Turkey) 2012	Didn't Qualify								
(Austria) 2014		16th place							
(Denmark) 2016		15th place							
(Slovenia) 2018	Didn't Qualify								
(Portugal) 2022	Didn't Qualify								
(Slovenia) 2024		9th place	8	5	2	1	209	188	+21
(Romania) 2026		20th place	9	2	0	7	273	290	–17
Total	7/15	0 Titles							

== Current squad ==
The following squad was selected for the 2017 Men's Junior World Handball Championship .

Head coach: Ilija Temelkovski

Assistant coach: Ice Sokoleski

No.	Pos.	Name	Date of birth (age)	Height	App.	Goals	Club
4	P	Milan Lazarevski	9 February 1997 (age 29)	1.97 m			(North Macedonia) RK Metalurg II
6	LW	Dimitar Dimitrioski	16 February 1998 (age 28)	1.82 m			(North Macedonia) RK Metalurg II
7	RW	Tomislav Jagurinovski	19 August 1998 (age 28)	1.87 m			(North Macedonia) RK Eurofarm Rabotnik
8	LB	Marko Neloski	6 June 1996 (age 30)	2.00 m			(North Macedonia) RK Metalurg
11	LB	Mario Tankoski	28 August 1998 (age 28)	1.92 m			(North Macedonia) RK Metalurg II
12	GK	Martin Tomovski	10 July 1997 (age 29)	1.90 m			(North Macedonia) RK Metalurg
13	RB	Martin Velkovski	10 March 1997 (age 29)	1.91 m			(North Macedonia) RK Metalurg
15	RW	Mice Shilegov	19 June 1998 (age 28)	1.76 m			(North Macedonia) RK Metalurg II
16	CB	Dario Petrovski	16 January 1998 (age 28)	1.89 m			(North Macedonia) RK Eurofarm Rabotnik
17	LB	Filip Taleski (c)	28 March 1996 (age 30)	2.01 m			(Germany) Rhein-Neckar Löwen
20	GK	Nikola Danilovski	1 February 1997 (age 29)	1.84 m			(North Macedonia) RK Pelister
27	CB	Filip Kuzmanovski	3 July 1996 (age 30)	1.98 m			(North Macedonia) RK Metalurg
29	CB	Goran Krstevski	29 March 1996 (age 30)	1.96 m			(North Macedonia) RK Eurofarm Rabotnik
34	CB	Ivan Djonov	15 July 1997 (age 29)	1.95 m			(North Macedonia) RK Tineks Prolet
71	LW	Davor Palevski	26 February 1997 (age 29)	1.80 m			(North Macedonia) RK Metalurg
99	P	Filip Arsenovski	30 July 1998 (age 28)	1.90 m			(North Macedonia) RK Metalurg
