= Serbia men's national junior handball team =

Serbia

Information
- Association: Serbian Handball Federation
- Coach: Dalibor Čutura

Colours
1st	2nd

Results

IHF U-21 World Championship
- Appearances: 6
- Best result: 4h (2023)

European Junior Championship
- Appearances: 9
- Best result: (bronze) 3rd (2022)
- Last updated on Unknown.

The Serbia national junior handball team is the national under-21 handball team of Serbia. Controlled by the Serbian Handball Federation, that is an affiliate of the International Handball Federation IHF as well as a member of the European Handball Federation EHF, The team represents Serbia in international matches.

== Statistics ==
=== IHF Junior World Championship record ===
Champions Runners up Third place Fourth place

IHF Junior World Championship record
Year	Round	Position	GP	W	D	L	GS	GA	GD
2007 (North Macedonia)	Didn't Qualify								
2009 (Egypt)	Didn't Qualify								
2011 (Greece)		18th place							
2013 (Bosnia and Herzegovina)		10th place							
2015 (Brazil)		17th place							
2017	Didn't Qualify								
2019		14th place							
2023 (Germany) (Greece)		4th place							
2025 (Poland)		17th place							
Total	/9								

=== EHF European Junior Championship ===
Champions Runners up Third place Fourth place

EHF Junior European Championship record
Year	Round	Position	GP	W	D	L	GS	GA	GD
(Romania) 2008		11th place							
(Slovakia) 2010		10th place							
(Turkey) 2012		15th place							
(Austria) 2014		8th place							
(Denmark) 2016		14th place							
(Slovenia) 2018		8th place							
(Portugal) 2022	Semi-Finals	3rd place							
(Slovenia) 2024		13th place							
(Romania) 2026		19th place							
Total	9/9	0 Titles							
