= Norway men's national junior handball team =

Norway

Information
- Association: Norwegian Handball Federation

Colours
1st	2nd

Results

IHF U-21 World Championship
- Appearances: 14 (First in 1977)
- Best result: 4th place : (1995)

European Junior Championship
- Appearances: 8 (First in 1998)
- Best result: 6th place : (2012)
- Last updated on Unknown.

The Norway national junior handball team is the national under-20 handball team of Norway. Controlled by the Norwegian Handball Federation, it represents Norway in international matches.

== History ==
The slower development of men's handball in Norway is reflected in the fact that the Scandinavian nation have rarely managed to break into the top 10 positions at the IHF Men's Junior World Championship. The clear best result was fourth place in 1995. Aside from that ranking, Norway have only placed in the top 10 five other times – the last being in 2025.

== Statistics ==
=== IHF Junior World Championship record ===
Champions Runners up Third place Fourth place

Year	Round	Position	GP	W	D	L	GS	GA	GD
1977 (Sweden)		18th place							
1979 (Denmark) (Sweden)		13th place							
1981 (Portugal)	Didn't Qualify								
1983 (Finland)	Didn't Qualify								
1985 (Italy)	Didn't Qualify								
1987 (Socialist Federal Republic of Yugoslavia)		10th place							
1989 (Spain)	Didn't Qualify								
1991 (Greece)	Didn't Qualify								
1993 (Egypt)		7th place							
1995 (Argentina)		4th place							
1997 (Turkey)	Didn't Qualify								
1999 (Qatar)		15th place							
2001 (Switzerland)		14th place							
2003 (Brazil)	Didn't Qualify								
2005 (Hungary)	Didn't Qualify								
2007 (North Macedonia)	Didn't Qualify								
2009 (Egypt)		16th place							
2011 (Greece)		10th place							
2013 (Bosnia and Herzegovina)	Didn't Qualify								
2015 (Brazil)		15th place							
2017 (Algeria)		11th place							
2019 (Spain)		8th place							
2023 (Germany) (Greece)		18th place							
2025 (Poland)		8th place							
Total	14/24	0 Titles							

=== EHF European Junior Championship ===
Champions Runners up Third place Fourth place

European Junior Championship record
Year	Round	Position	GP	W	D	L	GS	GA	GD
(Romania) 1996	Didn't Qualify								
(Austria) 1998		9th place							
(Greece) 2000		10th place							
(Poland) 2002	Didn't Qualify								
(Latvia) 2004	Didn't Qualify								
(Austria) 2006		12th place							
(Romania) 2008	Didn't Qualify								
(Slovakia) 2010	Didn't Qualify								
(Turkey) 2012		6th place							
(Austria) 2014	Didn't Qualify								
(Denmark) 2016	Didn't Qualify								
(Slovenia) 2018	Intermediate round	9th place							
(Portugal) 2022	Intermediate round	15th place							
(Slovenia) 2024	Main round	8th place							
(Romania) 2026	Intermediate round	10th place							
Total	8/15	0 Titles							
