= 2022 European Men's U-20 Handball Championship =

13th edition of the European Men's U-20 Handball Championship

2022 European Men's Under-20 Handball Championship

Tournament details
- Host country: Portugal
- Venue(s): 3 (in 3 host cities)
- Dates: 7–17 July 2022
- Teams: 16 (from 1 confederation)

Final positions
- Champions: Spain (3rd title)
- Runners-up: Portugal
- Third place: Serbia
- Fourth place: Sweden

Tournament statistics
- Matches played: 56
- Goals scored: 3,354 (59.89 per match)
- Attendance: 21,269 (380 per match)
- Top scorer(s): (Portugal) Francisco Costa (58 goals)

Awards
- Best player: (Serbia) Stefan Dodić

The 2022 European Men's U-20 Handball Championship was the 13th edition of the European Men's U-20 Handball Championship, held in Porto, Portugal from 7 to 17 July 2022.

== Qualification ==
Competition	Dates	Host	Vacancies	Qualified
Men's 19 EHF EURO 2021	12–22 August 2021	Croatia	13	Germany; Croatia; Spain; Slovenia; Denmark; Portugal; Sweden; Iceland; Hungary; France; Norway; Italy; Serbia
Men's 19 EHF Championship 2021	9–15 August 2021	(North Macedonia) Skopje	1	Poland
Men's 19 EHF Championship 2021	16–22 August 2021	(Latvia) Riga	1	Montenegro
Men's 19 EHF Championship 2021	16–22 August 2021	(Bulgaria) Varna	1	Faroe Islands

== Draw ==
The draw was held on 18 February 2022 in Gondomar.

Pot 1	Pot 2	Pot 3	Pot 4
Germany; Croatia; Spain; Slovenia	Portugal; Denmark; Sweden; Iceland	Hungary; France; Norway; Italy	Serbia; Poland; Faroe Islands; Montenegro

== Preliminary round ==
=== Group A ===
Pos	Team	Pld	W	D	L	GF	GA	GD	Pts	Qualification
1	Portugal (H)	3	3	0	0	112	92	+20	6	Main round
2	Spain	3	2	0	1	114	93	+21	4	Main round
3	Poland	3	1	0	2	95	108	−13	2	Intermediate round
4	Norway	3	0	0	3	77	105	−28	0	Intermediate round

Source: EHF
Rules for classification: 1) points; 2) head-to-head points; 3) head-to-head goal difference; 4) head-to-head number of goals scored; 5) Goal difference.
(H) Hosts

7 July 2022; 17:00	Spain	38–25	Norway	Pavilhao Desportivo Municipal, Vila Nova de Gaia; Attendance: 175; Referees: Laron, Lindenbaum (ISR)
7 July 2022; 17:00	Ibáñez, Biescas 5	(18–10)	Jevnaker 4	Pavilhao Desportivo Municipal, Vila Nova de Gaia; Attendance: 175; Referees: Laron, Lindenbaum (ISR)
7 July 2022; 17:00	6× (suspension)	Report	1× (yellow card) 2× (suspension)	Pavilhao Desportivo Municipal, Vila Nova de Gaia; Attendance: 175; Referees: Laron, Lindenbaum (ISR)

7 July 2022; 19:45	Portugal	41–31	Poland	Pavilhao Desportivo Municipal, Vila Nova de Gaia; Attendance: 1,500; Referees: Carmaux, Mursch (FRA)
7 July 2022; 19:45	M. Costa 10	(21–11)	Powarzyński 6	Pavilhao Desportivo Municipal, Vila Nova de Gaia; Attendance: 1,500; Referees: Carmaux, Mursch (FRA)
7 July 2022; 19:45	1× (yellow card) 7× (suspension)	Report	6× (suspension)	Pavilhao Desportivo Municipal, Vila Nova de Gaia; Attendance: 1,500; Referees: Carmaux, Mursch (FRA)

8 July 2022; 17:00	Poland	32–41	Spain	Pavilhao Desportivo Municipal, Vila Nova de Gaia; Attendance: 210; Referees: Kinnari, Skogberg (FIN)
8 July 2022; 17:00	Będzikowski 8	(20–19)	Aregay 8	Pavilhao Desportivo Municipal, Vila Nova de Gaia; Attendance: 210; Referees: Kinnari, Skogberg (FIN)
8 July 2022; 17:00	1× (suspension)	Report	2× (suspension)	Pavilhao Desportivo Municipal, Vila Nova de Gaia; Attendance: 210; Referees: Kinnari, Skogberg (FIN)

8 July 2022; 19:30	Norway	26–35	Portugal	Pavilhao Desportivo Municipal, Vila Nova de Gaia; Attendance: 512; Referees: Thiyagarajah, Thiyagarajah (GER)
8 July 2022; 19:30	Stankiewicz 7	(13–16)	F. Costa 10	Pavilhao Desportivo Municipal, Vila Nova de Gaia; Attendance: 512; Referees: Thiyagarajah, Thiyagarajah (GER)
8 July 2022; 19:30	5× (suspension)	Report	1× (yellow card) 6× (suspension)	Pavilhao Desportivo Municipal, Vila Nova de Gaia; Attendance: 512; Referees: Thiyagarajah, Thiyagarajah (GER)

10 July 2022; 17:00	Norway	26–32	Poland	Pavilhao Multiusos de Gondomar, Gondomar; Attendance: 273; Referees: Metalari, Nikolovski (MKD)
10 July 2022; 17:00	Stankiewicz 7	(10–15)	Kosznik 6	Pavilhao Multiusos de Gondomar, Gondomar; Attendance: 273; Referees: Metalari, Nikolovski (MKD)
10 July 2022; 17:00	1× (yellow card) 3× (suspension)	Report	3× (suspension)	Pavilhao Multiusos de Gondomar, Gondomar; Attendance: 273; Referees: Metalari, Nikolovski (MKD)

10 July 2022; 19:30	Spain	35–36	Portugal	Pavilhao Multiusos de Gondomar, Gondomar; Attendance: 2,500; Referees: Boričić, Marković (SRB)
10 July 2022; 19:30	Llamazares 8	(16–15)	F. Costa 14	Pavilhao Multiusos de Gondomar, Gondomar; Attendance: 2,500; Referees: Boričić, Marković (SRB)
10 July 2022; 19:30	6× (suspension) 1× (red card)	Report	7× (suspension)	Pavilhao Multiusos de Gondomar, Gondomar; Attendance: 2,500; Referees: Boričić, Marković (SRB)

=== Group B ===
Pos	Team	Pld	W	D	L	GF	GA	GD	Pts	Qualification
1	Denmark	3	2	0	1	94	85	+9	4 (Note: Hungary 25–28 Denmark)	Main round
2	Hungary	3	2	0	1	96	71	+25	4	Main round
3	Slovenia	3	1	0	2	77	92	−15	2 (Note: Faroe Islands 27–28 Slovenia)	Intermediate round
4	Faroe Islands	3	1	0	2	81	100	−19	2	Intermediate round

Source: EHF
Rules for classification: 1) points; 2) head-to-head points; 3) head-to-head goal difference; 4) head-to-head number of goals scored; 5) Goal difference.
Notes:

7 July 2022; 12:00	Denmark	32–33	Faroe Islands	Pavilhao Desportivo Municipal, Vila Nova de Gaia; Attendance: 300; Referees: Pirvu, Potirniche (ROU)
7 July 2022; 12:00	Arnoldsen 12	(15–15)	E. Ellefsen á Skipagøtu 9	Pavilhao Desportivo Municipal, Vila Nova de Gaia; Attendance: 300; Referees: Pirvu, Potirniche (ROU)
7 July 2022; 12:00	1× (yellow card) 4× (suspension)	Report	2× (yellow card) 6× (suspension)	Pavilhao Desportivo Municipal, Vila Nova de Gaia; Attendance: 300; Referees: Pirvu, Potirniche (ROU)

7 July 2022; 14:30	Slovenia	22–31	Hungary	Pavilhao Desportivo Municipal, Vila Nova de Gaia; Attendance: 100; Referees: Boričić, Marković (SRB)
7 July 2022; 14:30	Janc 8	(11–14)	B. Krakovszki 9	Pavilhao Desportivo Municipal, Vila Nova de Gaia; Attendance: 100; Referees: Boričić, Marković (SRB)
7 July 2022; 14:30	2× (yellow card) 4× (suspension)	Report	1× (yellow card) 5× (suspension)	Pavilhao Desportivo Municipal, Vila Nova de Gaia; Attendance: 100; Referees: Boričić, Marković (SRB)

8 July 2022; 12:00	Faroe Islands	27–28	Slovenia	Pavilhao Desportivo Municipal, Vila Nova de Gaia; Attendance: 212; Referees: Geraets, Geraets (NED)
8 July 2022; 12:00	West Av Teigum 6	(15–18)	Janc 8	Pavilhao Desportivo Municipal, Vila Nova de Gaia; Attendance: 212; Referees: Geraets, Geraets (NED)
8 July 2022; 12:00	2× (suspension)	Report	1× (yellow card) 3× (suspension)	Pavilhao Desportivo Municipal, Vila Nova de Gaia; Attendance: 212; Referees: Geraets, Geraets (NED)

8 July 2022; 14:30	Hungary	25–28	Denmark	Pavilhao Desportivo Municipal, Vila Nova de Gaia; Attendance: 200; Referees: Carmaux, Mursch (FRA)
8 July 2022; 14:30	Lukács 6	(18–16)	Arnoldsen 8	Pavilhao Desportivo Municipal, Vila Nova de Gaia; Attendance: 200; Referees: Carmaux, Mursch (FRA)
8 July 2022; 14:30	5× (suspension)	Report	7× (suspension)	Pavilhao Desportivo Municipal, Vila Nova de Gaia; Attendance: 200; Referees: Carmaux, Mursch (FRA)

10 July 2022; 12:00	Hungary	40–21	Faroe Islands	Pavilhao Multiusos de Gondomar, Gondomar; Attendance: 103; Referees: Kinnari, Skogberg (FIN)
10 July 2022; 12:00	Jánosi 6	(19–8)	R. Ellefsen á Skipagøtu 5	Pavilhao Multiusos de Gondomar, Gondomar; Attendance: 103; Referees: Kinnari, Skogberg (FIN)
10 July 2022; 12:00	1× (yellow card) 5× (suspension)	Report	1× (suspension)	Pavilhao Multiusos de Gondomar, Gondomar; Attendance: 103; Referees: Kinnari, Skogberg (FIN)

10 July 2022; 14:30	Slovenia	27–34	Denmark	Pavilhao Multiusos de Gondomar, Gondomar; Attendance: - Referees: Thiyagarajah, Thiyagarajah (GER)
10 July 2022; 14:30	Ćirović 8	(15–17)	Arnoldsen 8	Pavilhao Multiusos de Gondomar, Gondomar; Attendance: - Referees: Thiyagarajah, Thiyagarajah (GER)
10 July 2022; 14:30	1× (yellow card) 5× (suspension)	Report	1× (yellow card) 3× (suspension)	Pavilhao Multiusos de Gondomar, Gondomar; Attendance: - Referees: Thiyagarajah, Thiyagarajah (GER)

=== Group C ===
Pos	Team	Pld	W	D	L	GF	GA	GD	Pts	Qualification
1	Sweden	3	3	0	0	89	67	+22	6	Main round
2	France	3	2	0	1	76	75	+1	4	Main round
3	Croatia	3	1	0	2	73	75	−2	2	Intermediate round
4	Montenegro	3	0	0	3	67	88	−21	0	Intermediate round

Source: EHF
Rules for classification: 1) points; 2) head-to-head points; 3) head-to-head goal difference; 4) head-to-head number of goals scored; 5) Goal difference.

7 July 2022; 12:00	Sweden	31–19	Montenegro	Centro de Desportos e Congresso de Matosinhos, Matosinhos; Attendance: 50; Referees: Geraets, Geraets (NED)
7 July 2022; 12:00	Elovson 7	(16–11)	Vukićević 5	Centro de Desportos e Congresso de Matosinhos, Matosinhos; Attendance: 50; Referees: Geraets, Geraets (NED)
7 July 2022; 12:00	1× (suspension)	Report	1× (yellow card) 3× (suspension)	Centro de Desportos e Congresso de Matosinhos, Matosinhos; Attendance: 50; Referees: Geraets, Geraets (NED)

7 July 2022; 19:30	Croatia	21–23	France	Centro de Desportos e Congresso de Matosinhos, Matosinhos; Attendance: 131; Referees: Bogdanovs, Cernavskis (LAT)
7 July 2022; 19:30	Lulić 7	(12–10)	Fadhuile 6	Centro de Desportos e Congresso de Matosinhos, Matosinhos; Attendance: 131; Referees: Bogdanovs, Cernavskis (LAT)
7 July 2022; 19:30	1× (yellow card) 3× (suspension)	Report	2× (suspension)	Centro de Desportos e Congresso de Matosinhos, Matosinhos; Attendance: 131; Referees: Bogdanovs, Cernavskis (LAT)

8 July 2022; 17:00	Montenegro	25–28	Croatia	Centro de Desportos e Congresso de Matosinhos, Matosinhos; Attendance: 87; Referees: Metalari, Nikolovski (MKD)
8 July 2022; 17:00	Barjaktarović 8	(14–12)	Svržnjak 8	Centro de Desportos e Congresso de Matosinhos, Matosinhos; Attendance: 87; Referees: Metalari, Nikolovski (MKD)
8 July 2022; 17:00	5× (suspension)	Report	4× (suspension)	Centro de Desportos e Congresso de Matosinhos, Matosinhos; Attendance: 87; Referees: Metalari, Nikolovski (MKD)

8 July 2022; 19:30	France	24–31	Sweden	Centro de Desportos e Congresso de Matosinhos, Matosinhos; Attendance: 65; Referees: Accoto Martins, Accoto Martins (POR)
8 July 2022; 19:30	Fadhuile 4	(16–18)	Ljungquist, Månsson 6	Centro de Desportos e Congresso de Matosinhos, Matosinhos; Attendance: 65; Referees: Accoto Martins, Accoto Martins (POR)
8 July 2022; 19:30	3× (suspension)	Report	6× (suspension)	Centro de Desportos e Congresso de Matosinhos, Matosinhos; Attendance: 65; Referees: Accoto Martins, Accoto Martins (POR)

10 July 2022; 12:00	Croatia	24–27	Sweden	Centro de Desportos e Congresso de Matosinhos, Matosinhos; Attendance: 50; Referees: Pirvu, Potirniche (ROU)
10 July 2022; 12:00	Hršak 8	(11–17)	Möller 6	Centro de Desportos e Congresso de Matosinhos, Matosinhos; Attendance: 50; Referees: Pirvu, Potirniche (ROU)
10 July 2022; 12:00	1× (yellow card) 6× (suspension) 1× (red card)	Report	3× (suspension)	Centro de Desportos e Congresso de Matosinhos, Matosinhos; Attendance: 50; Referees: Pirvu, Potirniche (ROU)

10 July 2022; 14:30	France	29–23	Montenegro	Centro de Desportos e Congresso de Matosinhos, Matosinhos; Attendance: 80; Referees: Laron, Lindenbaum (ISR)
10 July 2022; 14:30	Bzdynga, Vincent 6	(16–12)	Vukićević 5	Centro de Desportos e Congresso de Matosinhos, Matosinhos; Attendance: 80; Referees: Laron, Lindenbaum (ISR)
10 July 2022; 14:30	5× (suspension)	Report	1× (suspension)	Centro de Desportos e Congresso de Matosinhos, Matosinhos; Attendance: 80; Referees: Laron, Lindenbaum (ISR)

=== Group D ===
Pos	Team	Pld	W	D	L	GF	GA	GD	Pts	Qualification
1	Serbia	3	2	1	0	95	87	+8	5	Main round
2	Germany	3	2	0	1	100	86	+14	4	Main round
3	Italy	3	1	0	2	82	95	−13	2	Intermediate round
4	Iceland	3	0	1	2	81	90	−9	1	Intermediate round

Source: EHF
Rules for classification: 1) points; 2) head-to-head points; 3) head-to-head goal difference; 4) head-to-head number of goals scored; 5) Goal difference.

7 July 2022; 14:30	Germany	35–26	Italy	Centro de Desportos e Congresso de Matosinhos, Matosinhos; Attendance: 150; Referees: Kinnari, Skogberg (FIN)
7 July 2022; 14:30	Freihöfer 8	(15–12)	Fadanelli 5	Centro de Desportos e Congresso de Matosinhos, Matosinhos; Attendance: 150; Referees: Kinnari, Skogberg (FIN)
7 July 2022; 14:30	3× (suspension)	Report	1× (yellow card) 2× (suspension)	Centro de Desportos e Congresso de Matosinhos, Matosinhos; Attendance: 150; Referees: Kinnari, Skogberg (FIN)

7 July 2022; 17:00	Iceland	28–28	Serbia	Centro de Desportos e Congresso de Matosinhos, Matosinhos; Attendance: 100; Referees: Accoto Martins, Accoto Martins (POR)
7 July 2022; 17:00	Óskarsson 7	(18–15)	Dodić 6	Centro de Desportos e Congresso de Matosinhos, Matosinhos; Attendance: 100; Referees: Accoto Martins, Accoto Martins (POR)
7 July 2022; 17:00	5× (suspension) 1× (red card)	Report	8× (suspension) 2× (red card)	Centro de Desportos e Congresso de Matosinhos, Matosinhos; Attendance: 100; Referees: Accoto Martins, Accoto Martins (POR)

8 July 2022; 12:00	Italy	27–26	Iceland	Centro de Desportos e Congresso de Matosinhos, Matosinhos; Attendance: 100; Referees: Pirvu, Potirniche (ROU)
8 July 2022; 12:00	Fadanelli 9	(15–11)	Óskarsson, Rúnarsson 6	Centro de Desportos e Congresso de Matosinhos, Matosinhos; Attendance: 100; Referees: Pirvu, Potirniche (ROU)
8 July 2022; 12:00	2× (yellow card) 3× (suspension) 1× (red card)	Report	4× (suspension)	Centro de Desportos e Congresso de Matosinhos, Matosinhos; Attendance: 100; Referees: Pirvu, Potirniche (ROU)

8 July 2022; 14:30	Serbia	33–30	Germany	Centro de Desportos e Congresso de Matosinhos, Matosinhos; Attendance: 100; Referees: Laron, Lindenbaum (ISR)
8 July 2022; 14:30	Kos 11	(16–17)	Orlov 6	Centro de Desportos e Congresso de Matosinhos, Matosinhos; Attendance: 100; Referees: Laron, Lindenbaum (ISR)
8 July 2022; 14:30	1× (yellow card) 6× (suspension)	Report	1× (yellow card) 1× (suspension)	Centro de Desportos e Congresso de Matosinhos, Matosinhos; Attendance: 100; Referees: Laron, Lindenbaum (ISR)

10 July 2022; 17:00	Germany	35–27	Iceland	Centro de Desportos e Congresso de Matosinhos, Matosinhos; Attendance: 100; Referees: Geraets, Geraets (NED)
10 July 2022; 17:00	Scholtes 10	(17–15)	three players 4	Centro de Desportos e Congresso de Matosinhos, Matosinhos; Attendance: 100; Referees: Geraets, Geraets (NED)
10 July 2022; 17:00	1× (suspension)	Report	1× (yellow card) 3× (suspension)	Centro de Desportos e Congresso de Matosinhos, Matosinhos; Attendance: 100; Referees: Geraets, Geraets (NED)

10 July 2022; 19:30	Italy	29–34	Serbia	Centro de Desportos e Congresso de Matosinhos, Matosinhos; Attendance: 100; Referees: Bogdanovs, Cernavskis (LAT)
10 July 2022; 19:30	Bortoli, Fadanelli 8	(11–19)	Rogan, Stanisavljević 7	Centro de Desportos e Congresso de Matosinhos, Matosinhos; Attendance: 100; Referees: Bogdanovs, Cernavskis (LAT)
10 July 2022; 19:30	1× (yellow card) 3× (suspension)	Report	1× (yellow card) 7× (suspension)	Centro de Desportos e Congresso de Matosinhos, Matosinhos; Attendance: 100; Referees: Bogdanovs, Cernavskis (LAT)

== Intermediate round ==
Points and goals gained in the preliminary group against teams that proceeded to the Intermediate round was transferred.

=== Group I1 ===
Pos	Team	Pld	W	D	L	GF	GA	GD	Pts	Qualification
1	Slovenia	3	3	0	0	99	87	+12	6	9–12th place semifinals
2	Faroe Islands	3	2	0	1	98	91	+7	4	9–12th place semifinals
3	Poland	3	1	0	2	90	93	−3	2	13–16th place semifinals
4	Norway	3	0	0	3	91	107	−16	0	13–16th place semifinals

Source: EHF
Rules for classification: 1) points; 2) head-to-head points; 3) head-to-head goal difference; 4) head-to-head number of goals scored; 5) Goal difference.

12 July 2022; 12:00	Norway	31–33	Faroe Islands	Pavilhao Multiusos de Gondomar, Gondomar; Attendance: 125; Referees: Kinnari, Skogberg (FIN)
12 July 2022; 12:00	Haugli 8	(16–16)	E. Ellefsen á Skipagøtu 12	Pavilhao Multiusos de Gondomar, Gondomar; Attendance: 125; Referees: Kinnari, Skogberg (FIN)
12 July 2022; 12:00		Report	2× (suspension)	Pavilhao Multiusos de Gondomar, Gondomar; Attendance: 125; Referees: Kinnari, Skogberg (FIN)

12 July 2022; 14:30	Poland	26–29	Slovenia	Pavilhao Multiusos de Gondomar, Gondomar; Attendance: 250; Referees: Laron, Lindenbaum (ISR)
12 July 2022; 14:30	Wiaderny 8	(13–16)	Janc 8	Pavilhao Multiusos de Gondomar, Gondomar; Attendance: 250; Referees: Laron, Lindenbaum (ISR)
12 July 2022; 14:30	1× (yellow card) 4× (suspension) 1× (red card)	Report	1× (yellow card) 5× (suspension)	Pavilhao Multiusos de Gondomar, Gondomar; Attendance: 250; Referees: Laron, Lindenbaum (ISR)

13 July 2022; 12:00	Faroe Islands	38–32	Poland	Pavilhao Multiusos de Gondomar, Gondomar; Attendance: 100; Referees: Bogdanovs, Cernavskis (LAT)
13 July 2022; 12:00	West Av Teigum 7	(19–11)	Wiaderny 7	Pavilhao Multiusos de Gondomar, Gondomar; Attendance: 100; Referees: Bogdanovs, Cernavskis (LAT)
13 July 2022; 12:00	5× (suspension) 1× (red card)	Report	1× (suspension)	Pavilhao Multiusos de Gondomar, Gondomar; Attendance: 100; Referees: Bogdanovs, Cernavskis (LAT)

13 July 2022; 14:30	Slovenia	42–34	Norway	Pavilhao Multiusos de Gondomar, Gondomar; Attendance: 250; Referees: Pirvu, Potirniche (ROU)
13 July 2022; 14:30	Miklavec 8	(22–16)	Hald 10	Pavilhao Multiusos de Gondomar, Gondomar; Attendance: 250; Referees: Pirvu, Potirniche (ROU)
13 July 2022; 14:30	5× (suspension)	Report	1× (yellow card) 5× (suspension)	Pavilhao Multiusos de Gondomar, Gondomar; Attendance: 250; Referees: Pirvu, Potirniche (ROU)

=== Group I2 ===
Pos	Team	Pld	W	D	L	GF	GA	GD	Pts	Qualification
1	Italy	3	2	1	0	83	77	+6	5	9–12th place semifinals
2	Iceland	3	2	0	1	100	75	+25	4	9–12th place semifinals
3	Croatia	3	1	1	1	73	83	−10	3	13–16th place semifinals
4	Montenegro	3	0	0	3	79	100	−21	0	13–16th place semifinals

Source: EHF
Rules for classification: 1) points; 2) head-to-head points; 3) head-to-head goal difference; 4) head-to-head number of goals scored; 5) Goal difference.

12 July 2022; 12:00	Montenegro	28–41	Iceland	Pavilhao Desportivo Municipal, Vila Nova de Gaia; Attendance: 100; Referees: Bogdanovs, Cernavskis (LAT)
12 July 2022; 12:00	Dragašević 7	(13–18)	Rúnarsson 10	Pavilhao Desportivo Municipal, Vila Nova de Gaia; Attendance: 100; Referees: Bogdanovs, Cernavskis (LAT)
12 July 2022; 12:00	1× (suspension)	Report	3× (suspension)	Pavilhao Desportivo Municipal, Vila Nova de Gaia; Attendance: 100; Referees: Bogdanovs, Cernavskis (LAT)

12 July 2022; 14:30	Croatia	25–25	Italy	Pavilhao Desportivo Municipal, Vila Nova de Gaia; Attendance: 108; Referees: Carmaux, Mursch (FRA)
12 July 2022; 14:30	Božičević, Hršak 5	(13–8)	Bortoli 9	Pavilhao Desportivo Municipal, Vila Nova de Gaia; Attendance: 108; Referees: Carmaux, Mursch (FRA)
12 July 2022; 14:30	1× (yellow card) 2× (suspension)	Report	1× (suspension)	Pavilhao Desportivo Municipal, Vila Nova de Gaia; Attendance: 108; Referees: Carmaux, Mursch (FRA)

13 July 2022; 12:00	Iceland	33–20	Croatia	Pavilhao Desportivo Municipal, Vila Nova de Gaia; Attendance: 152; Referees: Thiyagarajah, Thiyagarajah (GER)
13 July 2022; 12:00	Rúnarsson 6	(16–10)	Zubac 6	Pavilhao Desportivo Municipal, Vila Nova de Gaia; Attendance: 152; Referees: Thiyagarajah, Thiyagarajah (GER)
13 July 2022; 12:00	4× (suspension)	Report	1× (yellow card) 3× (suspension)	Pavilhao Desportivo Municipal, Vila Nova de Gaia; Attendance: 152; Referees: Thiyagarajah, Thiyagarajah (GER)

13 July 2022; 14:30	Italy	31–26	Montenegro	Pavilhao Desportivo Municipal, Vila Nova de Gaia; Attendance: 135; Referees: Geraets, Geraets (NED)
13 July 2022; 14:30	Bortoli, De Angelis 8	(14–12)	Dragašević 8	Pavilhao Desportivo Municipal, Vila Nova de Gaia; Attendance: 135; Referees: Geraets, Geraets (NED)
13 July 2022; 14:30	2× (suspension)	Report	1× (suspension)	Pavilhao Desportivo Municipal, Vila Nova de Gaia; Attendance: 135; Referees: Geraets, Geraets (NED)

== Main round ==
Points and goals gained in the preliminary group against teams that advanced was transferred to the main round.

=== Group M1 ===
Pos	Team	Pld	W	D	L	GF	GA	GD	Pts	Qualification
1	Portugal (H)	3	2	0	1	92	88	+4	4 (Note: Spain 35–36 Portugal)	Semifinals
2	Spain	3	2	0	1	107	100	+7	4	Semifinals
3	Denmark	3	1	0	2	82	91	−9	2 (Note: Hungary 25–28 Denmark)	5–8th place semifinals
4	Hungary	3	1	0	2	88	90	−2	2	5–8th place semifinals

Source: EHF
Rules for classification: 1) points; 2) head-to-head points; 3) head-to-head goal difference; 4) head-to-head number of goals scored; 5) Goal difference.
(H) Hosts
Notes:

12 July 2022; 17:00	Spain	32–30	Hungary	Pavilhao Desportivo Municipal, Vila Nova de Gaia; Attendance: 200; Referees: Thiyagarajah, Thiyagarajah (GER)
12 July 2022; 17:00	Aregay 6	(19–13)	Imre 7	Pavilhao Desportivo Municipal, Vila Nova de Gaia; Attendance: 200; Referees: Thiyagarajah, Thiyagarajah (GER)
12 July 2022; 17:00	3× (suspension)	Report	1× (yellow card) 4× (suspension)	Pavilhao Desportivo Municipal, Vila Nova de Gaia; Attendance: 200; Referees: Thiyagarajah, Thiyagarajah (GER)

12 July 2022; 19:30	Portugal	26–20	Denmark	Pavilhao Desportivo Municipal, Vila Nova de Gaia; Attendance: 1,250; Referees: Metalari, Nikolovski (MKD)
12 July 2022; 19:30	F. Costa 10	(17–10)	Kløve 4	Pavilhao Desportivo Municipal, Vila Nova de Gaia; Attendance: 1,250; Referees: Metalari, Nikolovski (MKD)
12 July 2022; 19:30	1× (yellow card) 3× (suspension)	Report	3× (suspension)	Pavilhao Desportivo Municipal, Vila Nova de Gaia; Attendance: 1,250; Referees: Metalari, Nikolovski (MKD)

13 July 2022; 17:00	Denmark	34–40	Spain	Pavilhao Desportivo Municipal, Vila Nova de Gaia; Attendance: 153; Referees: Carmaux, Mursch (FRA)
13 July 2022; 17:00	Arnoldsen 9	(17–20)	Santiago 7	Pavilhao Desportivo Municipal, Vila Nova de Gaia; Attendance: 153; Referees: Carmaux, Mursch (FRA)
13 July 2022; 17:00	1× (yellow card) 3× (suspension)	Report	1× (yellow card) 3× (suspension)	Pavilhao Desportivo Municipal, Vila Nova de Gaia; Attendance: 153; Referees: Carmaux, Mursch (FRA)

13 July 2022; 19:30	Hungary	33–30	Portugal	Pavilhao Desportivo Municipal, Vila Nova de Gaia; Attendance: 500; Referees: Boričić, Marković (SRB)
13 July 2022; 19:30	Papp 9	(17–13)	three players 5	Pavilhao Desportivo Municipal, Vila Nova de Gaia; Attendance: 500; Referees: Boričić, Marković (SRB)
13 July 2022; 19:30	4× (suspension)	Report	3× (suspension)	Pavilhao Desportivo Municipal, Vila Nova de Gaia; Attendance: 500; Referees: Boričić, Marković (SRB)

=== Group M2 ===
Pos	Team	Pld	W	D	L	GF	GA	GD	Pts	Qualification
1	Serbia	3	2	0	1	93	95	−2	4 (Note: Sweden 27–32 Serbia)	Semifinals
2	Sweden	3	2	0	1	87	81	+6	4	Semifinals
3	Germany	3	1	0	2	87	89	−2	2 (Note: France 27–32 Germany)	5–8th place semifinals
4	France	3	1	0	2	89	91	−2	2	5–8th place semifinals

Source: EHF
Rules for classification: 1) points; 2) head-to-head points; 3) head-to-head goal difference; 4) head-to-head number of goals scored; 5) Goal difference.
Notes:

12 July 2022; 17:00	France	27–32	Germany	Pavilhao Multiusos de Gondomar, Gondomar; Attendance: 150; Referees: Accoto Martins, Accoto Martins (POR)
12 July 2022; 17:00	Pimenta 9	(13–12)	Orlov, Scholtes 6	Pavilhao Multiusos de Gondomar, Gondomar; Attendance: 150; Referees: Accoto Martins, Accoto Martins (POR)
12 July 2022; 17:00	5× (suspension) 1× (red card)	Report	1× (suspension)	Pavilhao Multiusos de Gondomar, Gondomar; Attendance: 150; Referees: Accoto Martins, Accoto Martins (POR)

12 July 2022; 19:30	Sweden	27–32	Serbia	Pavilhao Multiusos de Gondomar, Gondomar; Attendance: 120; Referees: Pirvu, Potirniche (ROU)
12 July 2022; 19:30	Sjögren 7	(12–15)	three players 6	Pavilhao Multiusos de Gondomar, Gondomar; Attendance: 120; Referees: Pirvu, Potirniche (ROU)
12 July 2022; 19:30	2× (suspension)	Report	6× (suspension)	Pavilhao Multiusos de Gondomar, Gondomar; Attendance: 120; Referees: Pirvu, Potirniche (ROU)

13 July 2022; 17:00	Serbia	28–38	France	Pavilhao Multiusos de Gondomar, Gondomar; Attendance: 100; Referees: Laron, Lindenbaum (ISR)
13 July 2022; 17:00	three players 5	(13–18)	Vincent 7	Pavilhao Multiusos de Gondomar, Gondomar; Attendance: 100; Referees: Laron, Lindenbaum (ISR)
13 July 2022; 17:00	1× (yellow card) 3× (suspension)	Report	4× (suspension)	Pavilhao Multiusos de Gondomar, Gondomar; Attendance: 100; Referees: Laron, Lindenbaum (ISR)

13 July 2022; 19:30	Germany	25–29	Sweden	Pavilhao Multiusos de Gondomar, Gondomar; Attendance: 100; Referees: Metalari, Nikolovski (MKD)
13 July 2022; 19:30	Seitz 5	(10–11)	Palmar 7	Pavilhao Multiusos de Gondomar, Gondomar; Attendance: 100; Referees: Metalari, Nikolovski (MKD)
13 July 2022; 19:30	2× (suspension)	Report	1× (suspension)	Pavilhao Multiusos de Gondomar, Gondomar; Attendance: 100; Referees: Metalari, Nikolovski (MKD)

== Final round ==
=== Bracket ===
Championship bracket

Semifinals
15 July
Portugal	25
Sweden	24
15 July
Serbia	29
Spain	32

Final
17 July
Portugal	35
Spain	37
Third place
17 July
Sweden	26
Serbia	30

9th place bracket

9–12th place semifinals
15 July
Slovenia (Pen.)	37
Iceland	35
15 July
Italy	28
Faroe Islands	30

9th place
16 July
Slovenia	28
Faroe Islands	25
11th place
16 July
Iceland	45
Italy	34

5th place bracket

5–8th place semifinals
15 July
Denmark	25
France	27
15 July
Germany	32
Hungary	35

5th place
17 July
France	29
Hungary	35
7th place
17 July
Denmark	27
Germany	32

13th place bracket

13–16th place semifinals
15 July
Poland	30
Montenegro	26
15 July
Croatia	32
Norway	22

13th place
16 July
Poland (Pen.)	33
Croatia	31
15th place
16 July
Montenegro	22
Norway	30

=== 13–16th place semifinals ===
15 July 2022; 12:00	Poland	30–26	Montenegro	Pavilhao Multiusos de Gondomar, Gondomar; Attendance: 50; Referees: Kinnari, Skogberg (FIN)
15 July 2022; 12:00	Nowak 7	(14–16)	Dragašević 7	Pavilhao Multiusos de Gondomar, Gondomar; Attendance: 50; Referees: Kinnari, Skogberg (FIN)
15 July 2022; 12:00	1× (suspension)	Report	1× (yellow card) 3× (suspension)	Pavilhao Multiusos de Gondomar, Gondomar; Attendance: 50; Referees: Kinnari, Skogberg (FIN)

15 July 2022; 14:30	Croatia	32–22	Norway	Pavilhao Multiusos de Gondomar, Gondomar; Attendance: 200; Referees: Geraets, Geraets (NED)
15 July 2022; 14:30	Hršak, Zubac 8	(16–8)	Haugli 6	Pavilhao Multiusos de Gondomar, Gondomar; Attendance: 200; Referees: Geraets, Geraets (NED)
15 July 2022; 14:30	5× (suspension)	Report	1× (suspension)	Pavilhao Multiusos de Gondomar, Gondomar; Attendance: 200; Referees: Geraets, Geraets (NED)

=== 9–12th place semifinals ===
15 July 2022
17:00
Slovenia
37–35 (Pen.)
Iceland
Pavilhao Multiusos de Gondomar, Gondomar
Attendance: 100
Referees: Laron, Lindenbaum (ISR)
Ćirović 10
(18–19)
Rúnarsson 7
1× (yellow card) 4× (suspension)
Report
2× (yellow card) 6× (suspension)

FT: 32–32 Pen: 5–3

15 July 2022; 19:30	Italy	28–30	Faroe Islands	Pavilhao Multiusos de Gondomar, Gondomar; Attendance: 150; Referees: Bogdanovs, Cernavskis (LAT)
15 July 2022; 19:30	Fadanelli 7	(13–15)	West Av Teigum 11	Pavilhao Multiusos de Gondomar, Gondomar; Attendance: 150; Referees: Bogdanovs, Cernavskis (LAT)
15 July 2022; 19:30	1× (yellow card) 4× (suspension)	Report	3× (suspension)	Pavilhao Multiusos de Gondomar, Gondomar; Attendance: 150; Referees: Bogdanovs, Cernavskis (LAT)

=== 5–8th place semifinals ===
15 July 2022; 12:00	Germany	32–35	Hungary	Centro de Desportos e Congresso de Matosinhos, Matosinhos; Attendance: 127; Referees: Accoto Martins, Accoto Martins (POR)
15 July 2022; 12:00	Fischer 7	(16–19)	Lukács, Papp 7	Centro de Desportos e Congresso de Matosinhos, Matosinhos; Attendance: 127; Referees: Accoto Martins, Accoto Martins (POR)
15 July 2022; 12:00	1× (yellow card) 4× (suspension)	Report	2× (suspension)	Centro de Desportos e Congresso de Matosinhos, Matosinhos; Attendance: 127; Referees: Accoto Martins, Accoto Martins (POR)

15 July 2022; 14:30	Denmark	25–27	France	Centro de Desportos e Congresso de Matosinhos, Matosinhos; Attendance: 112; Referees: Boričić, Marković (SRB)
15 July 2022; 14:30	Mygind 6	(11–12)	Pimenta 6	Centro de Desportos e Congresso de Matosinhos, Matosinhos; Attendance: 112; Referees: Boričić, Marković (SRB)
15 July 2022; 14:30	4× (suspension)	Report	1× (yellow card) 2× (suspension)	Centro de Desportos e Congresso de Matosinhos, Matosinhos; Attendance: 112; Referees: Boričić, Marković (SRB)

=== Semifinals ===
15 July 2022; 16:30	Serbia	29–32	Spain	Centro de Desportos e Congresso de Matosinhos, Matosinhos; Attendance: 353; Referees: Metalari, Nikolovski (MKD)
15 July 2022; 16:30	Kos 9	(10–15)	Aregay, Llamazares 6	Centro de Desportos e Congresso de Matosinhos, Matosinhos; Attendance: 353; Referees: Metalari, Nikolovski (MKD)
15 July 2022; 16:30	1× (yellow card) 4× (suspension)	Report	1× (suspension)	Centro de Desportos e Congresso de Matosinhos, Matosinhos; Attendance: 353; Referees: Metalari, Nikolovski (MKD)

15 July 2022; 19:30	Portugal	25–24	Sweden	Centro de Desportos e Congresso de Matosinhos, Matosinhos; Attendance: 3,000; Referees: Pirvu, Potirniche (ROU)
15 July 2022; 19:30	F. Costa 5	(12–10)	Elovson, Ljungmark 4	Centro de Desportos e Congresso de Matosinhos, Matosinhos; Attendance: 3,000; Referees: Pirvu, Potirniche (ROU)
15 July 2022; 19:30	4× (suspension)	Report	1× (yellow card) 7× (suspension)	Centro de Desportos e Congresso de Matosinhos, Matosinhos; Attendance: 3,000; Referees: Pirvu, Potirniche (ROU)

=== 15th place game ===
16 July 2022; 16:00	Montenegro	22–30	Norway	Pavilhao Desportivo Municipal, Vila Nova de Gaia; Attendance: 150; Referees: Geraets, Geraets (NED)
16 July 2022; 16:00	Barjaktarović 6	(14–15)	Stankiewicz 9	Pavilhao Desportivo Municipal, Vila Nova de Gaia; Attendance: 150; Referees: Geraets, Geraets (NED)
16 July 2022; 16:00	2× (suspension)	Report		Pavilhao Desportivo Municipal, Vila Nova de Gaia; Attendance: 150; Referees: Geraets, Geraets (NED)

=== 13th place game ===
16 July 2022
18:30
Poland
33–31 (Pen.)
Croatia
Pavilhao Desportivo Municipal, Vila Nova de Gaia
Attendance: 100
Referees: Bogdanovs, Cernavskis (LAT)
Molski, Wiaderny 6
(13–13)
Hršak 10
3× (suspension)
Report
1× (yellow card) 4× (suspension)

FT: 29–29 Pen: 4–2

=== Eleventh place game ===
16 July 2022; 16:00	Iceland	45–34	Italy	Centro de Desportos e Congresso de Matosinhos, Matosinhos; Attendance: 100; Referees: Metalari, Nikolovski (MKD)
16 July 2022; 16:00	Óskarsson 8	(23–15)	Wierer 8	Centro de Desportos e Congresso de Matosinhos, Matosinhos; Attendance: 100; Referees: Metalari, Nikolovski (MKD)
16 July 2022; 16:00		Report		Centro de Desportos e Congresso de Matosinhos, Matosinhos; Attendance: 100; Referees: Metalari, Nikolovski (MKD)

=== Ninth place game ===
16 July 2022; 18:30	Slovenia	28–25	Faroe Islands	Centro de Desportos e Congresso de Matosinhos, Matosinhos; Attendance: 104; Referees: Kinnari, Skogberg (FIN)
16 July 2022; 18:30	Miklavec 7	(12–11)	Hansen, Selvindi 5	Centro de Desportos e Congresso de Matosinhos, Matosinhos; Attendance: 104; Referees: Kinnari, Skogberg (FIN)
16 July 2022; 18:30	2× (suspension)	Report	3× (suspension)	Centro de Desportos e Congresso de Matosinhos, Matosinhos; Attendance: 104; Referees: Kinnari, Skogberg (FIN)

=== Seventh place game ===
17 July 2022; 10:00	Denmark	27–32	Germany	Pavilhao Desportivo Municipal, Vila Nova de Gaia; Attendance: 57; Referees: Boričić, Marković (SRB)
17 July 2022; 10:00	Arnoldsen 10	(14–16)	Freihöfer 8	Pavilhao Desportivo Municipal, Vila Nova de Gaia; Attendance: 57; Referees: Boričić, Marković (SRB)
17 July 2022; 10:00	5× (suspension)	Report	4× (suspension)	Pavilhao Desportivo Municipal, Vila Nova de Gaia; Attendance: 57; Referees: Boričić, Marković (SRB)

=== Fifth place game ===
17 July 2022; 12:30	France	29–35	Hungary	Pavilhao Desportivo Municipal, Vila Nova de Gaia; Attendance: 150; Referees: Thiyagarajah, Thiyagarajah (GER)
17 July 2022; 12:30	Vincent 6	(14–16)	Lukács 7	Pavilhao Desportivo Municipal, Vila Nova de Gaia; Attendance: 150; Referees: Thiyagarajah, Thiyagarajah (GER)
17 July 2022; 12:30	2× (suspension)	Report	1× (yellow card) 5× (suspension)	Pavilhao Desportivo Municipal, Vila Nova de Gaia; Attendance: 150; Referees: Thiyagarajah, Thiyagarajah (GER)

=== Third place game ===
17 July 2022; 14:30	Sweden	26–30	Serbia	Centro de Desportos e Congresso de Matosinhos, Matosinhos; Attendance: 2,000; Referees: Accoto Martins, Accoto Martins (POR)
17 July 2022; 14:30	Ericsson 6	(12–17)	Kos 8	Centro de Desportos e Congresso de Matosinhos, Matosinhos; Attendance: 2,000; Referees: Accoto Martins, Accoto Martins (POR)
17 July 2022; 14:30	2× (suspension)	Report	3× (suspension)	Centro de Desportos e Congresso de Matosinhos, Matosinhos; Attendance: 2,000; Referees: Accoto Martins, Accoto Martins (POR)

=== Final ===
17 July 2022; 17:00	Portugal	35–37	Spain	Centro de Desportos e Congresso de Matosinhos, Matosinhos; Attendance: 3,525; Referees: Carmaux, Mursch (FRA)
17 July 2022; 17:00	F. Costa 11	(16–15)	Aregay 8	Centro de Desportos e Congresso de Matosinhos, Matosinhos; Attendance: 3,525; Referees: Carmaux, Mursch (FRA)
17 July 2022; 17:00	2× (suspension)	Report	3× (suspension)	Centro de Desportos e Congresso de Matosinhos, Matosinhos; Attendance: 3,525; Referees: Carmaux, Mursch (FRA)

== Final ranking ==
Rank	Team
1st place, gold medalist(s)	Spain
2nd place, silver medalist(s)	Portugal
3rd place, bronze medalist(s)	Serbia
4	Sweden
5	Hungary
6	France
7	Germany
8	Denmark
9	Slovenia
10	Faroe Islands
11	Iceland
12	Italy
13	Poland
14	Croatia
15	Norway
16	Montenegro

Team qualified for the 2023 Men's Junior World Handball Championship
Team qualified for the 2023 Men's Junior World Handball Championship as a host nation

== Awards ==
Award	Player
Most Valuable Player	Stefan Dodić (SRB)
Best Defence Player	Marko Tasić (SRB)
Topscorer	Francisco Costa (POR) (58 goals)

All-Star Team

Position	Player
Goalkeeper	Alexander Lindén (SWE)
Right wing	Antonio Martínez Llamazares (ESP)
Right back	Francisco Costa (POR)
Centre back	Thomas Sommer Arnoldsen (DEN)
Left back	Martim Costa (POR)
Left wing	Kelvin Roberts (SWE)
Pivot	Javier Rodríguez Moreno (ESP)
