= Germany men's national junior handball team =

Germany

Information
- Association: German Handball Association

Colours
1st	2nd

Results

IHF U-21 World Championship
- Appearances: 20 (First in 1977)
- Best result: (gold) Champions (2009, 2011, 2023)

European Junior Championship
- Appearances: 12 (First in 1996)
- Best result: (gold) Champions (2004, 2006, 2014)
- Last updated on Unknown.

The Germany national junior handball team is the national under–20 handball team of Germany. Controlled by the German Handball Association, it represents Germany in international matches.

== History ==
=== IHF Junior World Championship record ===
Champions Runners up Third place Fourth place

Year	Round	Position	GP	W	D	L	GS	GA	GD
1991 (Greece)		9th place							
1993 (Egypt)	Didn't Qualify								
1995 (Argentina)		11th place							
1997 (Turkey)		7th place							
1999 (Qatar)	Didn't Qualify								
2001 (Switzerland)		5th place							
2003 (Brazil)		13th place							
2005 (Hungary)	Semi-finals	4th place							
2007 (North Macedonia)	Final	Runners-up							
2009 (Egypt)	Final	Champions							
2011 (Greece)	Final	Champions							
2013 (Bosnia and Herzegovina)		11th place							
2015 (Brazil)	Semi-finals	3rd place							
2017 (Algeria)	Semi-finals	4th place							
2019 (Spain)		9th place							
2023 (Germany) (Greece)	Final	Champions							
2025 (Poland)		5th place							
Total	20/25	3 Titles							

=== European Championship ===
Champions Runners up Third place Fourth place

European Junior Championship record
Year	Round	Position	GP	W	D	L	GS	GA	GD
(Romania) 1996	Didn't Qualify								
(Austria) 1998	Didn't Qualify								
(Greece) 2000	Didn't Qualify								
(Poland) 2002	Didn't Qualify								
(Latvia) 2004	Final	Champions							
(Austria) 2006	Final	Champions							
(Romania) 2008	Final	Runners-up							
(Slovakia) 2010	Semi-finals	4th place							
(Turkey) 2012		7th place							
(Austria) 2014	Final	Champions							
(Denmark) 2016	Final	Runners-up							
(Slovenia) 2018	Semi-finals	3rd place	7	4	2	1	190	168	+22
(Portugal) 2022		7th place	7	4	0	3	221	204	+17
(Slovenia) 2024	Semi-finals	4th place	8	3	1	4	216	209	+7
(Romania) 2026	Quarter-finals	6th place	9	7	0	2	282	259	+23
Total	12/15	3 Titles							
