= European Men's U-20 Handball Championship =

International handball competition

The European Men's U-20 Handball Championship is the official competition for junior men's national handball teams of Europe, held by the European Handball Federation every two years.

In addition to crowning the European champions, the tournament also serves as a qualifying tournament for the IHF Junior World Handball Championship.

== Medal summary ==
#	Year	Host	Final			Third place match			Teams
#	Year	Host	Champion	Score	Runner-up	Third place	Score	Fourth place	Teams
1	1996; Details	Romania	Denmark	26–19	Spain	Russia	30–29 after extra time	France	12
2	1998; Details	Austria	Denmark	22–21	Yugoslavia	Hungary	29–24	Spain	12
3	2000; Details	Greece	Yugoslavia	34–29	Belarus	Spain	30–22	Denmark	12
4	2002; Details	Poland	Poland	29–25	Slovenia	Yugoslavia	33–30	Macedonia	12
5	2004; Details	Latvia	Germany	27–26	Denmark	Slovenia	29–28	Hungary	16
6	2006; Details	Austria	Germany	24–19	Sweden	Denmark	33–32	Serbia and Montenegro	16
7	2008; Details	Romania	Denmark	26–21	Germany	France	32–30	Sweden	16
8	2010; Details	Slovakia	Denmark	30–24	Portugal	Slovenia	30–25 after 2nd extra time	Germany	16
9	2012; Details	Turkey	Spain	34–21	Croatia	Slovenia	36–34 after penalty shootout	Sweden	16
10	2014; Details	Austria	Germany	26–24	Sweden	Spain	29–27	Denmark	16
11	2016; Details	Denmark	Spain	30–29; ET	Germany	France	35–30	Croatia	16
12	2018; Details	Slovenia	Slovenia	31–30	France	Germany	29–26	Portugal	16
	2020; Details	Croatia	Cancelled due to the COVID-19 pandemic						
13	2022; Details	Portugal	Spain	37–35	Portugal	Serbia	30–26	Sweden	16
14	2024; Details	Slovenia	Spain	35–31	Portugal	Denmark	26–23	Germany	24
15	2026; Details	Romania	Hungary	34–32	Sweden	Slovenia	30–28	Denmark	24
16	2028; Details	Slovenia							

== Medal count ==
Rank	Nation	Gold	Silver	Bronze	Total
1	Denmark	4	1	2	7
1	Spain	4	1	2	7
3	Germany	3	2	1	6
4	Slovenia	1	1	4	6
5	Yugoslavia	1	1	1	3
6	Hungary	1	0	1	2
7	Poland	1	0	0	1
8	Portugal	0	3	0	3
8	Sweden	0	3	0	3
10	France	0	1	2	3
11	Belarus	0	1	0	1
11	Croatia	0	1	0	1
13	Russia	0	0	1	1
13	Serbia	0	0	1	1
Totals (14 entries)		15	15	15	45

=== Participating nations ===
Nation	(Romania) 1996	(Austria) 1998	(Greece) 2000	(Poland) 2002	(Latvia) 2004	(Austria) 2006	(Romania) 2008	(Slovakia) 2010	(Turkey) 2012	(Austria) 2014	(Denmark) 2016	(Slovenia) 2018	(Portugal) 2022	(Slovenia) 2024	(Romania) 2026	Total
Austria	-	10	-	-	7	13	-	-	-	6	-	-	-	6	11	6
Belarus	10	-	2nd	-	-	5	-	-	-	11	-	-	-	-	-	4
Bosnia and Herzegovina	-	-	-	-	-	-	-	-	-	-	-	-	-	-	22	1
Czech Republic	9	8	-	8	12	14	8	14	13	-	-	-	-	19	21	10
Croatia	5	6	8	11	-	7	16	11	2nd	-	4	6	14	11	16	12
Denmark	1st	1st	4	5	2nd	3rd	1st	1st	10	4	6	12	8	3rd	4	15
Estonia	-	-	-	-	-	16	14	-	-	14	-	-	-	-	-	3
Faroe Islands	-	-	-	-	-	-	-	-	-	-	-	-	10	18	12	3
Finland	-	-	-	-	-	-	-	15	-	-	-	-	-	-	-	1
France	4	11	-	-	10	10	3rd	6	14	7	3rd	2nd	6	10	5	13
Germany	-	-	-	-	1st	1st	2nd	4	7	1st	2nd	3rd	7	4	6	11
Greece	12	7	12	-	-	-	-	-	-	-	-	-	-	23	21	5
Hungary	-	3rd	6	-	4	-	10	-	-	9	10	11	5	12	1st	10
Iceland	-	-	-	-	13	-	-	8	11	-	7	7	11	7	13	8
Israel	-	12	-	-	-	-	-	16	-	15	-	13	-	21	15	6
Italy	-	-	-	-	-	-	-	-	-	-	-	-	12	20	-	2
Latvia	-	-	11	-	16	15	-	-	-	-	-	-	-	-	17	4
Lithuania	-	-	-	12	-	-	-	-	-	-	-	-	-	-	-	1
Montenegro	-	-	-	-	-	-	-	-	-	-	-	-	16	24	-	2
Netherlands	-	-	-	-	-	-	-	-	-	-	12	-	-	-	-	1
North Macedonia	-	-	9	4	15	-	-	-	-	16	15	-	-	9	20	7
Norway	-	9	10	-	-	12	-	-	6	10	5	9	15	8	10	10
Poland	-	-	7	1st	14	11	12	-	12	-	8	16	13	14	18	11
Portugal	7	-	-	10	8	-	7	2nd	5	-	-	4	2nd	2nd	9	10
Romania	8	-	-	6	6	-	6	13	-	-	-	14	-	16	14	7
Russia	3rd	-	-	7	-	-	9	9	9	-	16	15	-	-	-	7
Serbia	-	-	-	-	-	-	11	10	15	8	14	8	3rd	13	19	9
Slovakia	-	-	-	-	-	6	15	12	-	13	-	-	-	-	-	4
Slovenia	-	-	5	2nd	3rd	8	13	3rd	3rd	5	11	1st	9	15	3rd	13
Spain	2nd	4	3rd	-	9	9	5	7	1st	3rd	1st	5	1st	1st	7	14
Sweden	11	5	-	-	5	2nd	4	5	4	2nd	13	10	4	5	2nd	13
Switzerland	-	-	-	-	11	-	-	-	8	12	9	-	-	17	8	6
Turkey	-	-	-	-	-	-	-	-	16	-	-	-	-	-	23	2
Ukraine	-	-	-	9	-	-	-	-	-	-	-	-	-	22	-	2
FR Yugoslavia	6	2nd	1st	3rd	-	4	-									5
Total	12	12	12	12	16	16	16	16	16	16	16	16	16	24	24	

== See also ==
- European Men's Handball Championship
- European Women's Junior Handball Championship
