= Slovenia men's national junior handball team =

Slovenia

Information
- Association: Slovenian Handball Federation

Colours
1st	2nd

Results

IHF U-21 World Championship
- Appearances: 13 (First in 1995)
- Best result: (bronze) Third place (2003, 2009)

European Junior Championship
- Appearances: 11 (First in 2000)
- Best result: (gold) Champions (2018)
- Last updated on Unknown.

The Slovenia national junior handball team is the national under-20 handball team of Slovenia. Controlled by the Slovenian Handball Federation, that is an affiliate of the International Handball Federation IHF as well as a member of the European Handball Federation EHF, The team represents Slovenia in international matches.

== Statistics ==
=== IHF Junior World Championship record ===
Champions Runners up Third place Fourth place

Year	Round	Position	GP	W	D	L	GS	GA	GD
1977 (Sweden)	Didn't Qualify								
1979 (Denmark) (Sweden)	Didn't Qualify								
1981 (Portugal)	Didn't Qualify								
1983 (Finland)	Didn't Qualify								
1985 (Italy)	Didn't Qualify								
1987 (Socialist Federal Republic of Yugoslavia)	Didn't Qualify								
1989 (Spain)	Didn't Qualify								
1991 (Greece)	Didn't Qualify								
1993 (Egypt)	Didn't Qualify								
1995 (Argentina)		10th place							
1997 (Turkey)		20th place							
1999 (Qatar)	Didn't Qualify								
2001 (Switzerland)		16th place							
2003 (Brazil)	Semi-Finals	3rd place							
2005 (Hungary)	Quarter-Finals	8th place							
2007 (North Macedonia)	Quarter-Finals	8th place							
2009 (Egypt)	Semi-Finals	3rd place							
2011 (Greece)	Quarter-Finals	8th place							
2013 (Bosnia and Herzegovina)		9th place							
2015 (Brazil)	Didn't Qualify								
2017 (Algeria)		9th place							
2019 (Spain)	Quarter-Finals	6th place							
2023 (Germany) (Greece)		20th place							
2025 (Poland)	Main Round	7th place							
Total	13/24	0 Titles							

=== EHF European Junior Championship ===
Champions Runners up Third place Fourth place

European Junior Championship record
Year	Round	Position	GP	W	D	L	GS	GA	GD
(Romania) 1996	Didn't Qualify								
(Austria) 1998	Didn't Qualify								
(Greece) 2000		5th place							
(Poland) 2002	Final	Runners-Up							
(Latvia) 2004	Semi-finals	Third place							
(Austria) 2006		8th place							
(Romania) 2008		13th place							
(Slovakia) 2010	Semi-finals	Third place							
(Turkey) 2012	Semi-finals	Third place							
(Austria) 2014	Didn't Qualify								
(Denmark) 2016	Didn't Qualify								
(Slovenia) 2018	Final	Champions							
(Portugal) 2022		9th place							
(Slovenia) 2024		15th place							
(Romania) 2026	Semi-finals	Third place							
Total	11/15	1 Title							
