= Patrick Helland Anderson =

Norwegian handball player (born 2004)

Personal information
- Nationality: Norwegian
- Born: 8 December 2004 (age 21) Ski, Norway
- Height: 1.92 m (6 ft 4 in)

Sport
- Sport: Handball
- Position: Right back
- Current club: Aalborg Håndbold
- Number: 9

Youth career
- Years: Team
- –: Ski IL
- –: Follo HK

Senior clubs
- Years: Team
- 2020–2021: GOG Håndbold
- 2021–2022: Follo HK
- 2022–2025: Elverum Håndball
- 2025–: Aalborg Håndbold
National team
Years	Team	Apps	(Gls)
2024–	Norway	22	(80)

Patrick Helland Anderson (born 8 December 2004) is a Norwegian handball player for Aalborg Håndbold and the Norwegian national team.

== Career ==
He made his debut for the national team on 6 November 2024 against Denmark, at age 19.

On 17 December 2025, he was selected to represent Norway at the 2026 European Men's Handball Championship.

== Achievements ==
- Norwegian League:
  - Gold: 2024/25
  - Silver: 2022/23, 2023/24
- Norwegian Cup:
  - Finalist: 2022/23, 2023/24, 2024
- Danish League:
  - Gold: 2025/26

== Individual awards ==
- All-Star Right Back of the 2024 European Men's U-20 Handball Championship.
