= Tri Lilije Hall =

Sports venue in Laško, Slovenia

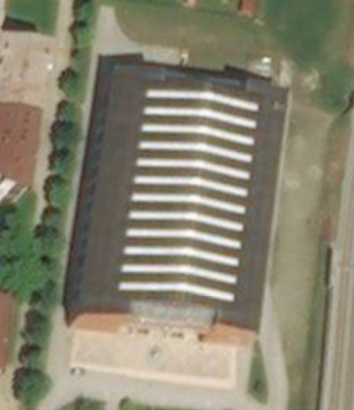
- Interactive map of Tri Lilije Hall
- Location: Poženelova ulica 22, Laško, Slovenia
- Coordinates: 46.164708°N 15.230361°E
- Owner: Municipality of Laško
- Capacity: 2,500
- Field size: 22,604 square feet (2,100.0 m^{2})

Construction
- Opened: 1995

Tenant
- KK Zlatorog Laško

Tri Lilije Hall (Slovene: Dvorana Tri lilije) is a multi-purpose sports venue located in Laško, Slovenia. The capacity of the arena is 2,500 for basketball matches.
