= Ilija Temelkovski =

Macedonian handball coach

Ilija Temelkovski (Macedonian: Илија Темелковски) is the current coach of RK Tineks Prolet. He led Macedonia to an 11th-place finish at the 2009 World Men's Handball Championship in Croatia. In 2016, he returned in the national team now as an assistant.
