= Montenegro men's national junior handball team =

Montenegro

Information
- Association: Handball Federation of Montenegro
- Coach: Pero Miloševic

Colours
1st	2nd

Results

IHF U-21 World Championship
- Appearances: None

European Championship
- Appearances: 3
- Last updated on Unknown.

The Montenegro national under-21 handball team represents Montenegro in international handball competitions.

== Current squad ==
This list represents the Montenegro squad at the 2007

Goalkeepers:

- Marko Danilović ( (Montenegro) RK Sutjeska)
- Dalibor Petković ( (Montenegro) RK Lovćen)
- Goran Anđelić ( (Montenegro) RK Pljevlja)

Wings:

- Filip Blečić ( (Montenegro) RK Sutjeska)
- Filip Popović ( (Montenegro) RK Boka)
- Marko Popivoda ( (Montenegro) RK Mornar)
- Mirza Ramusović ( (Montenegro) RK Berane)
- Marko Lasica ( (Montenegro) RK Lovćen)

Guards:

- Janko Kusović ( (Montenegro) RK Cepelin)
- Veljko Šćepnović ( (Serbia) RK Vrbas)
- Vuk Milošević ( (Spain) Algeciras BM)
- Žarko Marković ( (Hungary) FOTEX)
- Vasko Ševaljević ( (Montenegro) RK Boka)
- Ivan Đurković ( (Serbia) RK Partizan)
- Žarko Pejović ( (Serbia) RK Crvena Zvezda)
- Nebojša Lakić ( (Serbia) RK Željezničar)

Pivotmen:

- Andrija Pejović ( (Montenegro) RK Lovćen)
- Boško Bjelobrković (RK Budućnost)
- Boris Kljajević ( (Montenegro) RK Mojkovac)

Coaching staff:

- Coach: Brano Božović
- Assistant Coach: Milan Radović
