= 2007 Men's Junior World Handball Championship =

Tournament details
- Host country: North Macedonia
- Venues: 2 (in 2 host cities)
- Dates: August 13–26
- Teams: 20 (from 4 confederations)

Final positions
- Champions: Sweden (2nd title)
- Runners-up: Germany
- Third place: Denmark
- Fourth place: Croatia

Tournament statistics
- Matches played: 82
- Top scorer: (South Korea) Jongmin An (75)

Awards
- Best player: (Germany) Uwe Gensheimer

The 2007 Men's Junior World Handball Championship was the 16th edition of the tournament and was held at Skopje and Ohrid, North Macedonia from August 13–26, 2007.

== Venues ==
Two Macedonian cities were selected as hosts for the Championship:

Skopje	Host cities	Ohrid
SRC Kale	Host cities	Biljanini Izvori Sports Hall
Capacity: 2,250	Host cities	Capacity: 3,500

== Format ==
For the preliminary round, 20 teams were allocated into 4 groups where the top 3 from each group advanced to the next round. In the main round, the remaining 12 teams were divided into 2 groups of 6. The top 2 teams from each group moved on to the semifinals and the winners battled in the championship game.

== Preliminary round ==
=== Group A ===
Team	Pld	W	D	L	GF	GA	GD	Pts
Sweden	4	4	0	0	151	88	+63	8
Kuwait	4	2	0	2	105	127	−22	4
North Macedonia	4	2	0	2	122	102	+20	4
Portugal	4	2	0	2	127	125	+2	4
Angola	4	0	0	4	81	144	−63	0

All times are local (UTC+2).

13 August 2007; 16:00	Portugal	28 – 32	Kuwait	Biljanini Izvori Sports Hall, Ohrid; Attendance: 100; Referees: Favreto, Mello (BRA)
13 August 2007; 16:00		(14–17)		Biljanini Izvori Sports Hall, Ohrid; Attendance: 100; Referees: Favreto, Mello (BRA)
13 August 2007; 16:00		Report		Biljanini Izvori Sports Hall, Ohrid; Attendance: 100; Referees: Favreto, Mello (BRA)

13 August 2007; 21:00	North Macedonia	39 – 16	Angola	Biljanini Izvori Sports Hall, Ohrid; Attendance: 2500; Referees: Leandersson, Lindroos (FIN)
13 August 2007; 21:00		(15–7)		Biljanini Izvori Sports Hall, Ohrid; Attendance: 2500; Referees: Leandersson, Lindroos (FIN)
13 August 2007; 21:00		Report		Biljanini Izvori Sports Hall, Ohrid; Attendance: 2500; Referees: Leandersson, Lindroos (FIN)

14 August 2007; 17:00	Portugal	39 – 24	Angola	Biljanini Izvori Sports Hall, Ohrid; Attendance: 100; Referees: Cvetko, Kavalar (SVN)
14 August 2007; 17:00		(19–13)		Biljanini Izvori Sports Hall, Ohrid; Attendance: 100; Referees: Cvetko, Kavalar (SVN)
14 August 2007; 17:00		Report		Biljanini Izvori Sports Hall, Ohrid; Attendance: 100; Referees: Cvetko, Kavalar (SVN)

14 August 2007; 21:00	Sweden	44 – 19	Kuwait	Biljanini Izvori Sports Hall, Ohrid; Attendance: 150; Referees: Brunovský, Čanda (SVK)
14 August 2007; 21:00		(21–8)		Biljanini Izvori Sports Hall, Ohrid; Attendance: 150; Referees: Brunovský, Čanda (SVK)
14 August 2007; 21:00		Report		Biljanini Izvori Sports Hall, Ohrid; Attendance: 150; Referees: Brunovský, Čanda (SVK)

15 August 2007; 14:30	Sweden	30 – 27	North Macedonia	Biljanini Izvori Sports Hall, Ohrid; Attendance: 3200; Referees: Gousko, Repkin (BLR)
15 August 2007; 14:30		(13–12)		Biljanini Izvori Sports Hall, Ohrid; Attendance: 3200; Referees: Gousko, Repkin (BLR)
15 August 2007; 14:30		Report		Biljanini Izvori Sports Hall, Ohrid; Attendance: 3200; Referees: Gousko, Repkin (BLR)

16 August 2007; 17:00	Kuwait	29 – 28	Angola	Biljanini Izvori Sports Hall, Ohrid; Attendance: 100; Referees: Gubica, Milošević (CRO)
16 August 2007; 17:00		(11–11)		Biljanini Izvori Sports Hall, Ohrid; Attendance: 100; Referees: Gubica, Milošević (CRO)
16 August 2007; 17:00		Report		Biljanini Izvori Sports Hall, Ohrid; Attendance: 100; Referees: Gubica, Milošević (CRO)

16 August 2007; 21:00	Portugal	31 – 29	North Macedonia	Biljanini Izvori Sports Hall, Ohrid; Attendance: 2800; Referees: Brunovský, Čanda (SVK)
16 August 2007; 21:00		(15–11)		Biljanini Izvori Sports Hall, Ohrid; Attendance: 2800; Referees: Brunovský, Čanda (SVK)
16 August 2007; 21:00		Report		Biljanini Izvori Sports Hall, Ohrid; Attendance: 2800; Referees: Brunovský, Čanda (SVK)

17 August 2007; 19:00	Sweden	37 – 13	Angola	Biljanini Izvori Sports Hall, Ohrid; Attendance: 100; Referees: Favreto, Mello (BRA)
17 August 2007; 19:00		(21–8)		Biljanini Izvori Sports Hall, Ohrid; Attendance: 100; Referees: Favreto, Mello (BRA)
17 August 2007; 19:00		Report		Biljanini Izvori Sports Hall, Ohrid; Attendance: 100; Referees: Favreto, Mello (BRA)

18 August 2007; 17:00	Sweden	40 – 29	Portugal	Biljanini Izvori Sports Hall, Ohrid; Attendance: 150; Referees: Gubica, Milošević (CRO)
18 August 2007; 17:00		(16–13)		Biljanini Izvori Sports Hall, Ohrid; Attendance: 150; Referees: Gubica, Milošević (CRO)
18 August 2007; 17:00		Report		Biljanini Izvori Sports Hall, Ohrid; Attendance: 150; Referees: Gubica, Milošević (CRO)

18 July 2007; 21:00	North Macedonia	27 – 25	Kuwait	Biljanini Izvori Sports Hall, Ohrid; Attendance: 2800; Referees: Leandersson, Lindroos (FIN)
18 July 2007; 21:00		(14–15)		Biljanini Izvori Sports Hall, Ohrid; Attendance: 2800; Referees: Leandersson, Lindroos (FIN)
18 July 2007; 21:00		Report		Biljanini Izvori Sports Hall, Ohrid; Attendance: 2800; Referees: Leandersson, Lindroos (FIN)

=== Group B ===
Team	Pld	W	D	L	GF	GA	GD	Pts
Germany	4	4	0	0	151	88	+63	8
Egypt	4	2	0	2	105	127	−22	4
France	4	2	0	2	122	102	+20	4
Argentina	4	2	0	2	127	125	+2	4
Chile	4	0	0	4	81	144	−63	0

=== Group C ===
Team	Pld	W	D	L	GF	GA	GD	Pts
Croatia	4	4	0	0	151	88	+63	8
Slovenia	4	2	0	2	105	127	−22	4
Russia	4	2	0	2	122	102	+20	4
Tunisia	4	2	0	2	127	125	+2	4
Bulgaria	4	0	0	4	81	144	−63	0

=== Group D ===
Team	Pld	W	D	L	GF	GA	GD	Pts
Denmark	4	4	0	0	131	112	+19	8
Spain	4	3	0	1	133	116	+17	6
South Korea	4	2	0	2	133	139	−6	4
Brazil	4	1	0	3	118	129	−11	2
Slovakia	4	0	0	4	124	143	−19	0

== Main round ==
=== Group I ===
Team	Pld	W	D	L	GF	GA	GD	Pts
Sweden	5	4	0	1	155	125	+30	8
Germany	5	4	0	1	152	110	+42	8
Egypt	5	3	0	2	146	139	+7	6
France	5	2	0	3	140	130	+10	4
North Macedonia	5	2	0	3	127	139	−12	4
Kuwait	5	0	0	5	113	190	−77	0

20 August 2007; 17:00	Kuwait	20 – 36	France	Biljanini Izvori Sports Hall, Ohrid; Attendance: 150; Referees: Favreto, Mello (BRA)
20 August 2007; 17:00		(12–16)		Biljanini Izvori Sports Hall, Ohrid; Attendance: 150; Referees: Favreto, Mello (BRA)
20 August 2007; 17:00		Report		Biljanini Izvori Sports Hall, Ohrid; Attendance: 150; Referees: Favreto, Mello (BRA)

20 August 2007; 19:00	Sweden	25 – 28	Egypt	Biljanini Izvori Sports Hall, Ohrid; Attendance: 1000; Referees: Gousko, Repkin (BLR)
20 August 2007; 19:00		(14–12)		Biljanini Izvori Sports Hall, Ohrid; Attendance: 1000; Referees: Gousko, Repkin (BLR)
20 August 2007; 19:00		Report		Biljanini Izvori Sports Hall, Ohrid; Attendance: 1000; Referees: Gousko, Repkin (BLR)

20 August 2007; 21:00	North Macedonia	20 – 28	Germany	Biljanini Izvori Sports Hall, Ohrid; Attendance: 3300; Referees: Baranowski, Lemanowicz (POL)
20 August 2007; 21:00		(10–14)		Biljanini Izvori Sports Hall, Ohrid; Attendance: 3300; Referees: Baranowski, Lemanowicz (POL)
20 August 2007; 21:00		Report		Biljanini Izvori Sports Hall, Ohrid; Attendance: 3300; Referees: Baranowski, Lemanowicz (POL)

21 August 2007; 17:00	France	27 – 30	Sweden	Biljanini Izvori Sports Hall, Ohrid; Attendance: 400; Referees: Brunovsky, Canda (SVK)
21 August 2007; 17:00		(16–15)		Biljanini Izvori Sports Hall, Ohrid; Attendance: 400; Referees: Brunovsky, Canda (SVK)
21 August 2007; 17:00		Report		Biljanini Izvori Sports Hall, Ohrid; Attendance: 400; Referees: Brunovsky, Canda (SVK)

21 August 2007; 19:00	Germany	40 – 20	Kuwait	Biljanini Izvori Sports Hall, Ohrid; Attendance: 600; Referees: Leifsson, Palsson (ISL)
21 August 2007; 19:00		(20–7)		Biljanini Izvori Sports Hall, Ohrid; Attendance: 600; Referees: Leifsson, Palsson (ISL)
21 August 2007; 19:00		Report		Biljanini Izvori Sports Hall, Ohrid; Attendance: 600; Referees: Leifsson, Palsson (ISL)

21 August 2007; 21:00	Egypt	29 – 32	North Macedonia	Biljanini Izvori Sports Hall, Ohrid; Attendance: 3200; Referees: Gubica, Milošević (CRO)
21 August 2007; 21:00		(11–11)		Biljanini Izvori Sports Hall, Ohrid; Attendance: 3200; Referees: Gubica, Milošević (CRO)
21 August 2007; 21:00		Report		Biljanini Izvori Sports Hall, Ohrid; Attendance: 3200; Referees: Gubica, Milošević (CRO)

22 August 2007; 17:00	Kuwait	29 – 43	Egypt	Biljanini Izvori Sports Hall, Ohrid; Attendance: 200; Referees: Gousko, Repkin (BLR)
22 August 2007; 17:00		(14–24)		Biljanini Izvori Sports Hall, Ohrid; Attendance: 200; Referees: Gousko, Repkin (BLR)
22 August 2007; 17:00		Report		Biljanini Izvori Sports Hall, Ohrid; Attendance: 200; Referees: Gousko, Repkin (BLR)

22 August 2007; 19:00	Sweden	26 – 24	Germany	Biljanini Izvori Sports Hall, Ohrid; Attendance: 2000; Referees: Favreto, Mello (BRA)
22 August 2007; 19:00		(15–11)		Biljanini Izvori Sports Hall, Ohrid; Attendance: 2000; Referees: Favreto, Mello (BRA)
22 August 2007; 19:00		Report		Biljanini Izvori Sports Hall, Ohrid; Attendance: 2000; Referees: Favreto, Mello (BRA)

22 August 2007; 21:00	North Macedonia	21 – 27	France	Biljanini Izvori Sports Hall, Ohrid; Referees: Leifsson, Palsson (ISL)
22 August 2007; 21:00		(11–11)		Biljanini Izvori Sports Hall, Ohrid; Referees: Leifsson, Palsson (ISL)
22 August 2007; 21:00		Report		Biljanini Izvori Sports Hall, Ohrid; Referees: Leifsson, Palsson (ISL)

=== Group II ===
Team	Pld	W	D	L	GF	GA	GD	Pts
Croatia	5	4	1	0	158	129	+29	9
Denmark	5	4	0	1	154	144	+10	8
Spain	5	3	0	2	145	139	+6	6
Slovenia	5	1	2	2	131	138	−7	4
Russia	5	1	1	3	139	148	−9	3
South Korea	5	0	0	5	152	181	−29	0

== Placement matches ==
=== 11th/12th ===
25 August 2007
13:30
South Korea
39 – 37 (ET)
Kuwait
Biljanini Izvori Sports Hall, Ohrid
Attendance: 150
Referees: Nikolov, Nikolov (MKD)

(15–15)

Report

FT: 31-31 ET: 8-6

=== 9th/10th ===
24 August; 21:00	North Macedonia	23 – 30	Russia	Biljanini Izvori Sports Hall, Ohrid; Attendance: 1300; Referees: Leandersson, Lindroos (FIN)
24 August; 21:00		(11–18)		Biljanini Izvori Sports Hall, Ohrid; Attendance: 1300; Referees: Leandersson, Lindroos (FIN)
24 August; 21:00		Report		Biljanini Izvori Sports Hall, Ohrid; Attendance: 1300; Referees: Leandersson, Lindroos (FIN)

=== 7th/8th ===
24 August; 16:00	Slovenia	25 – 28	France	Biljanini Izvori Sports Hall, Ohrid; Attendance: 250; Referees: Al Mutawa, Al Suwailem (KUW)
24 August; 16:00		(13–15)		Biljanini Izvori Sports Hall, Ohrid; Attendance: 250; Referees: Al Mutawa, Al Suwailem (KUW)
24 August; 16:00		Report		Biljanini Izvori Sports Hall, Ohrid; Attendance: 250; Referees: Al Mutawa, Al Suwailem (KUW)

=== 5th/6th ===
24 August; 18:30	Egypt	26 – 32	Spain	Biljanini Izvori Sports Hall, Ohrid; Attendance: 400; Referees: Favreto, Mello (BRA)
24 August; 18:30		(12–15)		Biljanini Izvori Sports Hall, Ohrid; Attendance: 400; Referees: Favreto, Mello (BRA)
24 August; 18:30		Report		Biljanini Izvori Sports Hall, Ohrid; Attendance: 400; Referees: Favreto, Mello (BRA)

== Final round ==
Semifinal
24 August 2007– Ohrid
Sweden	32
Denmark	29
24 August 2007 – Ohrid
Croatia	22
Germany	29

Final
26 August 2007 – Ohrid
Sweden	31
Germany	29
Third place
26 August 2007 – Ohrid
Croatia	26
Denmark	27

=== Semifinals ===
24 August 2007; 18:30	Sweden	32 – 29	Denmark	Biljanini Izvori Sports Hall, Ohrid; Attendance: 1200; Referees: Baranowski, Lemanowicz (POL)
24 August 2007; 18:30		(17–14)		Biljanini Izvori Sports Hall, Ohrid; Attendance: 1200; Referees: Baranowski, Lemanowicz (POL)
24 August 2007; 18:30		Report		Biljanini Izvori Sports Hall, Ohrid; Attendance: 1200; Referees: Baranowski, Lemanowicz (POL)

24 August 2007; 21:00	Croatia	22 – 29	Germany	Biljanini Izvori Sports Hall, Ohrid; Attendance: 1500; Referees: Brunovský, Čanda (SVK)
24 August 2007; 21:00		(11–13)		Biljanini Izvori Sports Hall, Ohrid; Attendance: 1500; Referees: Brunovský, Čanda (SVK)
24 August 2007; 21:00		Report		Biljanini Izvori Sports Hall, Ohrid; Attendance: 1500; Referees: Brunovský, Čanda (SVK)

=== Bronze medal match ===
26 August 2007; 14:30	Croatia	26 – 27	Denmark	Biljanini Izvori Sports Hall, Ohrid; Attendance: 500; Referees: Canbro, Claesson (SWE)
26 August 2007; 14:30		(13–15)		Biljanini Izvori Sports Hall, Ohrid; Attendance: 500; Referees: Canbro, Claesson (SWE)
26 August 2007; 14:30		Report		Biljanini Izvori Sports Hall, Ohrid; Attendance: 500; Referees: Canbro, Claesson (SWE)

=== Gold medal match ===
26 August 2007; 17:00	Sweden	31 – 29	Germany	Biljanini Izvori Sports Hall, Ohrid; Attendance: 2000
26 August 2007; 17:00		(13–18)		Biljanini Izvori Sports Hall, Ohrid; Attendance: 2000
26 August 2007; 17:00		Report		Biljanini Izvori Sports Hall, Ohrid; Attendance: 2000

== Final standings ==
Rank	Team
Gold medal	Sweden
Silver medal	Germany
Bronze medal	Denmark
4	Croatia
5	Spain
6	Egypt
7	France
8	Slovenia
9	Russia
10	North Macedonia
11	South Korea
12	Kuwait
13	Argentina
14	Slovakia
15	Portugal
16	Brazil
17	Tunisia
18	Bulgaria
19	Angola
20	Chile

== All-star team ==
- Goalkeeper: Johan Sjöstrand (SWE)
- Left wing: Karim El Din Shoukry (EGY)
- Left back: Alen Blažević (CRO)
- Pivot: Henrik Toft Hansen (DEN)
- Centre back: Martin Strobel (GER)
- Right back: Johan Jakobsson (SWE)
- Right wing: Ivan Čupić (CRO)
