= Egypt men's national under-21 handball team =

Egypt

Information
- Nickname: The Pharaohs
- Association: Egyptian Handball Federation

Colours
1st	2nd

Results

IHF U-21 World Championship
- Appearances: 19 (First in 1983)
- Best result: (gold) (1993)

African Junior Championship
- Appearances: 21 (First in 1980)
- Best result: (gold) (1982, 1984, 1990, 1992, 1996, 1998, 2000, 2004, 2006, 2010, 2014, 2018, 2022, 2024, 2026)
- Last updated on Unknown.

Egypt men's national under-21 handball team
Medal record

World Junior Championship
Gold medal – first place	1993 Egypt	
Bronze medal – third place	1999 Qatar	
Bronze medal – third place	2019 Spain	

African Junior Championship
Gold medal – first place	1982 Benin	
Gold medal – first place	1984 Nigeria	
Gold medal – first place	1990 Egypt	
Gold medal – first place	1992 Tunisia	
Gold medal – first place	1996 Egypt	
Gold medal – first place	1998 Ivory Coast	
Gold medal – first place	2000 Tunisia	
Gold medal – first place	2004 Ivory Coast	
Gold medal – first place	2006 Ivory Coast	
Gold medal – first place	2010 Gabon	
Gold medal – first place	2014 Kenya	
Gold medal – first place	2018 Morocco	
Gold medal – first place	2022 Rwanda	
Gold medal – first place	2024 Tunisia	
Gold medal – first place	2026 Ivory Coast	
Silver medal – second place	1986 Algeria	
Silver medal – second place	1988 Tunisia	
Silver medal – second place	2002 Benin	
Silver medal – second place	2016 Mali	
Bronze medal – third place	2012 Ivory Coast	

The Egypt men's national under-21 handball team is the under-21s national team representing Egypt in international handball competitions and is controlled by the Egyptian Handball Federation.

== History ==
The Egypt junior handball team has participated in several junior's handball competitions and the first appearance was in the inaugural African Men's Junior Handball Championship in 1980 in Nigeria the team placed fourth, two years later in 1982 in Benin the Egyptian captured the first African and international title and have qualified to the 1983 IHF Men's Junior World Championship sow the first appearance was for good to gain experiences the Egyptian finished in the 13th rank. In the African championship Egypt continued the domination that was normal for them but in the IHF Men's Junior World Championship they were still far from the strongest European team's level. In 1993 Egypt was the host country. The Egyptians exploited the home court advantage and found their way to the final match again the Denmark where they won it by 22–19 and then Egypt became the World Champions.

== Competitive record ==
IHF Men's U21 Handball World Championship
Games	Round	Position	Pld	W	D	L	GF	GA	GD
1977 Sweden	Disqualified								
/ 1979 Denmark/Sweden	Disqualified								
1981 Portugal	Disqualified								
1983 Finland	Preliminary Round	13th of 16	6	2	0	4	105	143	–38
1985 Italy	Preliminary Round	15th of 16	6	2	0	4	122	140	–18
(Socialist Federal Republic of Yugoslavia) 1987 Yugoslavia	Disqualified								
1989 Spain	Preliminary Round	15th	6	1	0	5	117	149	–32
1991 Greece	Preliminary Round	13th	6	3	0	3	153	141	+12
1993 Egypt	Final	Champions	7	6	0	1	179	139	+40
1995 Argentina	Quarter-Final	6th	8	4	0	4	191	196	–5
1997 Turkey	Quarter-Final	6th	9	4	0	5	237	247	–10
1999 Qatar	Semi-Final	3rd	8	5	1	2	257	194	+63
2001 Switzerland	Main Round	8th	8	4	0	4	192	218	–26
2003 Brazil	Main Round	10th	8	1	3	4	196	214	–18
2005 Hungary	Main Round	7th	8	6	0	2	235	227	+8
2007 North Macedonia	Main Round	6th of 20	8	5	0	3	244	213	+31
2009 Egypt	Semi-Final	4th of 24	10	7	0	3	255	241	+14
2011 Greece	Semi-Final	4th of 24	9	5	0	4	251	222	+29
2013 Bosnia and Herzegovina	Quarter-Final	8th of 24	9	4	1	4	250	243	+6
2015 Brazil	Semi-Final	4th of 24	9	5	1	3	282	258	+24
2017 Algeria	Preliminary Round	17th of 24	7	3	0	4	193	215	–22
2019 Spain	Semi-Final	3rd of 24	9	8	0	1	327	255	+72
2021 Hungary	Cancelled								
/ 2023 Germany/Greece	Main Round	10th of 32	7	5	0	2	245	216	+29
2025 Poland	Quarter-Final	6th of 32	8	5	0	3	261	248	+13
2027 North Macedonia	Qualified								
Total	Qualified: 22/26		164	93	6	65	4,292	4,119	+173

African Men's Junior Handball Championship
Games	Round	Position	Pld	W	D	L	GF	GA	GD
1980 Nigeria	Bronze Medal Match	4th of 5							
1982 Benin	Final	Champions							
1984 Nigeria	Final	Champions							
1986 Algeria	Final	Runners-up	5	3	1	1	102	83	+19
1988 Tunisia	Final	Runners-up	5	4	0	1	118	104	+14
1990 Egypt	Final	Champions	4	4	0	0	84	53	+31
1992 Tunisia	Final	Champions	4	3	0	1	93	80	+13
1994 Egypt	Cancelled								
1996 Egypt	Final	Champions	3	2	1	0			
1998 Ivory Coast	Final	Champions							
2000 Tunisia	Final	Champions							+95
2002 Benin	Final	Runners-up	5	4	0	1	130	103	+27
2004 Ivory Coast	Final	Champions	4	4	0	0	156	100	+56
2006 Ivory Coast	Final	Champions	5	5	0	0	163	118	+45
2008 Libya	Did not enter								
2010 Gabon	Final	Champions	6	6	0	0	216	142	+74
2012 Ivory Coast	Bronze Medal Match	3rd of 11	6	5	0	1	204	132	+72
2014 Kenya	Final	Champions	5	5	0	0	190	98	+92
2016 Mali	Final	Runners-up	5	4	0	1	178	119	+59
2018 Morocco	Final	Champions	6	6	0	0	203	125	+78
2020 Morocco	Cancelled								
2022 Rwanda	Final	Champions	5	5	0	0	187	112	+75
2024 Tunisia	Final	Champions	6	6	0	0	236	145	+91
2026 Ivory Coast	Final	Champions	6	6	0	0	218	100	+118
Total	Qualified: 23/24		80	72	2	6	2478	1614	+959

== Team ==
The following players are representing Egypt in the U21 World Championship 2025.

A 18-player squad was announced on 13 June 2025.

Head coach: Magdy Abou El-Magd

No.	Pos.	Name	Date of birth (age)	Height	App.	Goals	Club
3	CB	Mohamed El-Sayed	8 January 2004 (aged 21)	1.82 m	38	109	National Bank of Egypt Akex Club
5	RB	Ziad Abdelrahim	18 February 2005 (aged 20)	1.96 m	33	60	National Bank of Egypt Akex Club
8	CB	Ziad Hashad	21 March 2004 (aged 21)	1.82 m	15	30	(Egypt) Zamalek
9	LW	Mohamed El-Nakkady	8 December 2005 (aged 19)	1.87 m	30	90	(Egypt) Zamalek
10	RW	Mohamed Emad	31 January 2004 (aged 21)	1.84 m	15	25	(Egypt) Tala'ea El Gaish
14	CB	Feras Ragab	5 January 2004 (aged 21)	1.88 m	36	68	(Egypt) Alexandria
16	GK	Youssef Ahmed	1 April 2004 (aged 21)	1.87 m	28	6	(Egypt) Alexandria
17	LW	Omar Baraka	30 January 2006 (aged 19)	1.88 m	0	0	(Egypt) Smouha
20	LW	Belal Masoud	8 February 2004 (aged 21)	1.82 m	3	4	(Germany) Bergischer
22	LB	Mohamed Mahmoud	1 January 2004 (aged 21)	1.90 m	22	37	(Egypt) Al Ahly
24	CB	Youssef Laoloua	20 January 2006 (aged 19)	1.91 m	29	65	(France) Nîmes Gard
30	GK	Youssef Salama	15 May 2004 (aged 21)	1.93 m	28	1	(Egypt) Zamalek
44	P	Moaz Azab	10 October 2005 (aged 19)	1.91 m	36	55	(Egypt) Al Ahly
64	LB	Omar Abdelhady	14 January 2004 (aged 21)	1.85 m	22	43	(Egypt) Tala'ea El Gaish
71	RW	Yassin Salem	18 September 2004 (aged 20)	1.83 m	22	33	(Egypt) Smouha
75	RW	Omar Mohamed	29 October 2004 (aged 20)	1.87 m	15	35	(Egypt) El Shams
96	P	Ahmed Taghian	6 January 2004 (aged 21)	1.89 m	10	25	(Egypt) Tala'ea El Gaish
99	LB	Mohamed El-Battawi	17 September 2004 (aged 20)	1.88 m	10	25	(Egypt) Zamalek

== See also ==
- Egypt men's national handball team
- Egypt men's national under-19 handball team
- Egypt men's national under-17 handball team
- Egypt men's national beach handball team
- Egypt national wheelchair handball team
