= Tunisia men's national junior handball team =

Tunisia U-20

Information
- Nickname: نسور قرطاج (Eagles of Carthage)
- Association: Tunisian Handball Federation
- Coach: (Tunisia) Mohamed Ali Sghir

Colours
1st	2nd

Results

IHF U-21 World Championship
- Appearances: 14 (First in 1997)
- Best result: Third (bronze) (2011)

African Championship
- Appearances: 20 (First in 1980)
- Best result: Champions (gold) (2002, 2008, 2012, 2016)
- Last updated on Unknown.

Tunisia men's national junior handball team
Medal record

Representing Tunisia

handball

World Junior Championship
Bronze medal – third place	2011	Team

African Junior Championship
Gold medal – first place	2002	Team
Gold medal – first place	2008	Team
Gold medal – first place	2012	Team
Gold medal – first place	2016	Team
Silver medal – second place	1980	Team
Silver medal – second place	1998	Team
Silver medal – second place	2000	Team
Silver medal – second place	2004	Team
Silver medal – second place	2006	Team
Silver medal – second place	2010	Team
Silver medal – second place	2014	Team
Silver medal – second place	2018	Team
Silver medal – second place	2024	Team
Silver medal – second place	2026	Team
Bronze medal – third place	1986	Team
Bronze medal – third place	1988	Team
Bronze medal – third place	1990	Team
Bronze medal – third place	1992	Team
Bronze medal – third place	1996	Team
Bronze medal – third place	2022	Team

Arab Junior Championship
Gold medal – first place	1989	Team
Gold medal – first place	2001	Team
Gold medal – first place	2023	Team

The Tunisia national junior handball team is the Tunisia national under-20 handball team (Arabic: منتخب تونس تحت 20 سنة لكرة اليد), nicknamed Les Aigles de Carthage (The Eagles of Carthage or The Carthage Eagles), that represent Tunisia in the international handball competitions and it is Controlled by the Tunisian Handball Federation

== History ==
Tunisia junior handball team has participated in international junior handball competitions the first appearance was at the African Championship in 1980 in that era only the African Champions was allowed to participate in the World Championship so Tunisia had waited until the year 1997 when the International Handball Federation had expanded to more teams including the African 1st and the runners up.

== Tournament record ==
=== World Championship ===
Champions Runners up Third place Fourth place

- Red border color indicates tournament was held on home soil.

Tunisia in the Junior World Championship record
Year	Round	Position	GP	W	D	L	GS	GA	GD
Sweden 1977	Did Not Qualified								
/ Denmark / Sweden 1979	Did Not Qualified								
Portugal 1981	Did Not Qualified								
Finland 1983	Did Not Qualified								
Italy 1985	Did Not Qualified								
(Socialist Federal Republic of Yugoslavia) Yugoslavia 1987	Did Not Qualified								
Spain 1989	Did Not Qualified								
Greece 1991	Did Not Qualified								
Egypt 1993	Did Not Qualified								
Argentina 1995	Did Not Qualified								
Turkey 1997	Quarter Finals	8th	8	5	0	3	219	224	–5
Qatar 1999	Second Round	9th	7	2	3	2	148	156	–8
Switzerland 2001	First Round	18th	8	1	0	7	180	222	–42
Brazil 2003	Second Round	9th	8	4	0	4	221	212	+9
Hungary 2005	First Round	17th	8	2	1	5	239	251	–12
(North Macedonia) Macedonia 2007	First Round	17th	8	3	0	5	243	240	+3
Egypt 2009	First Round	21st	7	2	0	5	203	209	–6
Greece 2011	Semi Finals	Third	9	7	0	2	264	218	+46
Bosnia and Herzegovina 2013	Round of 16	15th	9	4	0	5	235	241	–6
Brazil 2015	Round of 16	12th	7	3	0	4	206	200	+6
Algeria 2017	Quarter Finals	7th	9	4	1	4	276	243	+33
Spain 2019	Quarter Finals	7th	9	5	0	4	247	249	–2
Hungary 2021	Cancelled due to the COVID-19 pandemic								
Germany/Greece 2023	Main round	14th	7	3	0	4	198	231	–33
Poland 2025	President's Cup	21st	8	4	0	4	262	273	–11
Total	14/24	0 Titles	112	49	5	58	3141	3169	-28

=== African Championship ===
Tunisia in the African Junior Championship record
Year	Round	Position	GP	W	D	L	GS	GA	GD
Nigeria 1980	Final Round	2nd Place							
Benin 1982	Did Not Enter								
Nigeria 1984	Did Not Enter								
Algeria 1986	Semi Finals	Third Place							
Tunisia 1988	Semi Finals	Third Place							
Egypt 1990	Semi Finals	Third Place							
Tunisia 1992	Semi Finals	Third Place							
Egypt 1994	Cancelled due to insufficient number of participants								
Egypt 1996	Semi Finals	Third Place							
Ivory Coast 1998	Final Round	2nd Place							
Tunisia 2000	Final Round	2nd Place							
Benin 2002	Champions	1st Place							
Ivory Coast 2004	Final Round	2nd Place							
Ivory Coast 2006	Final Round	2nd Place							
Libya 2008	Champions	1st Place							
Gabon 2010	Final Round	2nd Place	6	5	0	1	212	136	+76
Ivory Coast 2012	Champions	1st Place	5	5	0	0	175	83	+92
Kenya 2014	Final Round	2nd Place	3	2	0	1	78	62	+16
Mali 2016	Champions	1st Place	6	6	0	0	184	94	+90
Morocco 2018	Final Round	2nd Place	6	5	0	1	209	142	+67
Morocco 2020	Cancelled due to the COVID-19 pandemic								
Rwanda 2022	Semi Finals	Third Place	5	4	0	1	148	117	+31
(Tunisia) Mahdia 2024	Final Round	2nd Place	6	5	0	1	187	139	+48
Ivory Coast 2026	Final Round	2nd Place							
Total	20/22	4 Titles							

=== Arab junior Championship ===
Tunisia in the Arab junior Championship record
Year	Round	Position	GP	W	D	L	GS	GA	GD
Tunisia 1989	Champions	1st							
Syria 2000	Did not compete								
Jordan 2001	Champions	1st							
Jordan 2014	Did not compete								
Tunisia 2023	Champions	1st							
Total	3/5	3 Titles							

== Team ==
=== Squad ===
- 2015 Men's Junior World Handball Championship
- Manager: (Tunisia) Mohamed Ali Sghir
- Assistant coach: (Tunisia) Adel Temessek
- Team Assistant: (Tunisia) Mohamed Nacer Sebai
- Physiotherapist: (Tunisia) Nabil Ben Abda
- Team Doctor : (Tunisia) Mourad Zarra

Tunisia national junior handball team roster
No.	Pos.	Player name	Date of birth	Height	Weight	Current Club
01	GK	Slim Skander	26 July 1995	1.89 m (6 ft 2 in)	79 kg (174 lb)	(Tunisia) Esperance de Tunis
12	GK	Maher Sghir	15 April 1994	1.92 m (6 ft 4 in)	84 kg (185 lb)	(Tunisia) El Makarem de Mahdia
16	GK	Mohamed Amine Elleuch	11 February 1994	1.90 m (6 ft 3 in)	87 kg (192 lb)	(Tunisia) US Gremda
	LW			1 m (3 ft 3 in)	1 kg (2.2 lb)
	LW			1 m (3 ft 3 in)	1 kg (2.2 lb)
	RW			1 m (3 ft 3 in)	1 kg (2.2 lb)
	RW			1 m (3 ft 3 in)	1 kg (2.2 lb)
	RW			1 m (3 ft 3 in)	1 kg (2.2 lb)
	LP			1 m (3 ft 3 in)	1 kg (2.2 lb)
	LP			1 m (3 ft 3 in)	1 kg (2.2 lb)
	CB			1 m (3 ft 3 in)	1 kg (2.2 lb)
	CB			1 m (3 ft 3 in)	1 kg (2.2 lb)
	CB			1 m (3 ft 3 in)	1 kg (2.2 lb)
	CB			1 m (3 ft 3 in)	1 kg (2.2 lb)
	CB			1 m (3 ft 3 in)	1 kg (2.2 lb)
	RB			1 m (3 ft 3 in)	1 kg (2.2 lb)

Legend

GK-Goalkeeper, LW-Left Winger, RW-Right Winger, LP-Line Player, BP-Back, LB-Left Back, CB-Center Back, RB-Right Back.

=== Notable players ===
- Amine Bannour
- Abdelhak Ben Salah
- Aymen Toumi
- Oussama Boughanmi
- Oussama Hosni
- Wael Jallouz
- Mosbah Sanaï
- Marouan Chouiref

=== Notable Coaches ===
- (France) Alain Portes

== See also ==
- Tunisia men's national handball team
- Tunisia men's national youth handball team
- Tunisia women's national junior handball team

Other handball codes

- Tunisia national beach handball team
