= 2025 IHF Men's U21 Handball World Championship =

Tournament details
- Host country: Poland
- Venues: 4 (in 4 host cities)
- Dates: 18–29 June
- Teams: 32 (from 5 confederations)

Final positions
- Champions: Denmark (4th title)
- Runners-up: Portugal
- Third place: Faroe Islands
- Fourth place: Sweden

Tournament statistics
- Matches played: 116
- Goals scored: 7,151 (61.65 per match)
- Attendance: 42,844 (369 per match)
- Top scorers: (Faroe Islands) Óli Mittún (73 goals)

Awards
- Best player: (Faroe Islands) Óli Mittún
- Best goalkeeper: (Portugal) Diogo Rêma Marques

The 2025 IHF Men's U21 Handball World Championship was the 25th edition of the IHF Men's U21 Handball World Championship, held in Poland under the aegis of International Handball Federation (IHF). It was held from 18 to 29 June 2025 and the first time in history that the championship is organised by Poland Handball Federation.

Denmark won their fourth title after beating Portugal in the final.

== Bidding process ==
Three nations entered bid for hosting the tournament:

- North Macedonia
- Poland
- Slovenia

North Macedonia and Slovenia later withdrew their bid. The tournament was awarded to Poland by the IHF Council in its meeting held in Cairo, Egypt on 28 February 2020.

== Qualification ==
Event	Dates	Host	Vacancies	Qualified
IHF Council Meeting	28 February 2020	(Egypt) Cairo	1	Poland
2024 U-20 European Championship	10–21 July 2024	(Slovenia) Celje	16	Austria; Croatia; Denmark; France; Germany; Hungary; Iceland; North Macedonia; Norway; Portugal; Romania; Serbia; Slovenia; Spain; Sweden; Switzerland
2024 Asian Junior Championship	14–25 July 2024	(Jordan) Amman	4	Bahrain; Japan; Saudi Arabia; South Korea
2024 African Junior Championship	9–16 September 2024	Tunisia	4	Algeria; Egypt; Morocco; Tunisia
2024 South and Central American Junior Championship	29 October – 2 November 2024	(Nicaragua) Managua	3	Argentina; Brazil; Uruguay
2024 North America and Caribbean Junior Championship	4–8 December 2024	Mexico City	2	Mexico; Canada
Wildcard	20 February 2025	—	1	Faroe Islands
IHF Trophy InterContinental Phase	12–16 March 2025	(Kosovo) Pristina	1	United States

== Draw ==
The draw was held on 28 January 2025 in Oslo.

=== Seeding ===
Pot 1	Pot 2	Pot 3	Pot 4
Norway; Austria; Sweden; Portugal; Denmark; Iceland; Germany; Spain	North Macedonia; Egypt; France; Croatia; Poland; Japan; Tunisia; Hungary	Argentina; Serbia; Slovenia; South Korea; Romania; Bahrain; Algeria; Morocco	Saudi Arabia; Brazil; Switzerland; United States; Mexico; Uruguay; Faroe Islands (Note: Team not determined at time of draw); Canada

== Referees ==
The referee pairs were selected on 30 April 2025.

Referees
Argentina	María Paolantoni; Mariana García
Bosnia and Herzegovina	Amar Konjičanin; Dino Konjičanin
Bosnia and Herzegovina	Vesna Balvan; Tatjana Praštalo
Denmark	Nichlas Nygaard; Jonas Primdahl
Denmark	Jacob Pagh; Karl Thygesen
France	Yann Carmaux; Julien Mursch
Germany	Ramesh Thiyagarajah; Suresh Thiyagarajah
Greece	Ioannis Fotakidis; Charalampos Kinatzidis

Referees
Hungary	Kristóf Altmár; Márton Horváth
Iran	Amir Gheisarian; Ahmad Gheisarian
Japan	Hideki Furukawa; Tetsuro Murata
North Macedonia	Danielo Bozhinovski; Viktor Nachevski
Montenegro	Novica Mitrović; Miljan Vešović
Netherlands	William Weijmans; Rick Wolbertus
Norway	Mads Fremstad; Jørgen Jørstad
Poland	Michał Fabryczny; Jakub Rawicki

Referees
Romania	Cristina Lovin; Simona Stancu
Senegal	Fadel Diop; Abdoulaye Faye
Serbia	Marko Sekulić; Vladimir Jovandić
Slovakia	Andrej Budzák; Michal Záhradník
Slovenia	Žan Pukšič; Miha Satler
Spain	Miguel Soria; Jesús Álvarez
Uruguay	Mathías Sosa; Cristian Lemes

== Preliminary round ==
All times are local (UTC+2).

=== Group A ===
Pos	Team	Pld	W	D	L	GF	GA	GD	Pts	Qualification
1	Norway	3	2	1	0	103	72	+31	5 (Note: Norway 33–33 Slovenia)	Main round
2	Slovenia	3	2	1	0	101	73	+28	5	Main round
3	Poland (H)	3	1	0	2	82	82	0	2	President's Cup
4	Uruguay	3	0	0	3	52	111	−59	0	President's Cup

Source: IHF
Rules for classification: 1) points; 2) head-to-head points; 3) head-to-head goal difference; 4) head-to-head number of goals scored; 5) goal difference.
(H) Hosts
Notes:

18 June 2025; 16:15	Norway	33–33	Slovenia	Orlen Arena, Płock; Attendance: 500; Referees: Thiyagarajah, Thiyagarajah (GER)
18 June 2025; 16:15	Hagen 10	(17–12)	Anžič 7	Orlen Arena, Płock; Attendance: 500; Referees: Thiyagarajah, Thiyagarajah (GER)
18 June 2025; 16:15	1× (yellow card) 3× (suspension)	Report	1× (yellow card) 1× (red card)	Orlen Arena, Płock; Attendance: 500; Referees: Thiyagarajah, Thiyagarajah (GER)

18 June 2025; 18:30	Poland	39–16	Uruguay	Orlen Arena, Płock; Attendance: 1,000; Referees: Diop, Faye (SEN)
18 June 2025; 18:30	Wielgucki 6	(19–8)	Rana 4	Orlen Arena, Płock; Attendance: 1,000; Referees: Diop, Faye (SEN)
18 June 2025; 18:30	5× (suspension)	Report	6× (suspension)	Orlen Arena, Płock; Attendance: 1,000; Referees: Diop, Faye (SEN)

20 June 2025; 16:15	Uruguay	17–35	Norway	Orlen Arena, Płock; Attendance: 200; Referees: Balvan, Praštalo (BIH)
20 June 2025; 16:15	Castro, Larrosa 4	(11–18)	Lid 8	Orlen Arena, Płock; Attendance: 200; Referees: Balvan, Praštalo (BIH)
20 June 2025; 16:15	4× (suspension)	Report	3× (suspension)	Orlen Arena, Płock; Attendance: 200; Referees: Balvan, Praštalo (BIH)

20 June 2025; 18:30	Poland	21–31	Slovenia	Orlen Arena, Płock; Attendance: 900; Referees: Carmaux, Mursch (FRA)
20 June 2025; 18:30	Siekierka 4	(9–14)	Ključanin 7	Orlen Arena, Płock; Attendance: 900; Referees: Carmaux, Mursch (FRA)
20 June 2025; 18:30	1× (yellow card) 7× (suspension)	Report	1× (yellow card) 10× (suspension) 1× (red card)	Orlen Arena, Płock; Attendance: 900; Referees: Carmaux, Mursch (FRA)

21 June 2025; 16:15	Slovenia	37–19	Uruguay	Orlen Arena, Płock; Attendance: 120; Referees: Thiyagarajah, Thiyagarajah (GER)
21 June 2025; 16:15	Anžič 8	(19–13)	Méndez 6	Orlen Arena, Płock; Attendance: 120; Referees: Thiyagarajah, Thiyagarajah (GER)
21 June 2025; 16:15	5× (suspension)	Report	3× (suspension)	Orlen Arena, Płock; Attendance: 120; Referees: Thiyagarajah, Thiyagarajah (GER)

21 June 2025; 18:30	Norway	35–22	Poland	Orlen Arena, Płock; Attendance: 800; Referees: Sekulić, Jovandić (SRB)
21 June 2025; 18:30	Hagen 8	(18–10)	Wasiak 5	Orlen Arena, Płock; Attendance: 800; Referees: Sekulić, Jovandić (SRB)
21 June 2025; 18:30	5× (suspension)	Report	1× (yellow card) 5× (suspension)	Orlen Arena, Płock; Attendance: 800; Referees: Sekulić, Jovandić (SRB)

=== Group B ===
Pos	Team	Pld	W	D	L	GF	GA	GD	Pts	Qualification
1	Austria	3	3	0	0	83	68	+15	6	Main round
2	Hungary	3	2	0	1	86	77	+9	4	Main round
3	Argentina	3	1	0	2	84	94	−10	2	President's Cup
4	Brazil	3	0	0	3	77	91	−14	0	President's Cup

Source: IHF
Rules for classification: 1) points; 2) head-to-head points; 3) head-to-head goal difference; 4) head-to-head number of goals scored; 5) goal difference.

18 June 2025; 11:45	Austria	29–23	Argentina	Orlen Arena, Płock; Attendance: 200; Referees: Carmaux, Mursch (FRA)
18 June 2025; 11:45	Möstl 6	(12–13)	three players 5	Orlen Arena, Płock; Attendance: 200; Referees: Carmaux, Mursch (FRA)
18 June 2025; 11:45	5× (suspension)	Report	5× (suspension)	Orlen Arena, Płock; Attendance: 200; Referees: Carmaux, Mursch (FRA)

18 June 2025; 14:00	Hungary	29–24	Brazil	Orlen Arena, Płock; Attendance: 300; Referees: Balvan, Praštalo (BIH)
18 June 2025; 14:00	Kovács 8	(13–10)	Bertoldo, Perin 5	Orlen Arena, Płock; Attendance: 300; Referees: Balvan, Praštalo (BIH)
18 June 2025; 14:00	2× (yellow card) 4× (suspension) 1× (red card)	Report	2× (yellow card) 2× (suspension)	Orlen Arena, Płock; Attendance: 300; Referees: Balvan, Praštalo (BIH)

20 June 2025; 11:45	Brazil	24–32	Austria	Orlen Arena, Płock; Attendance: 100; Referees: Jovandić, Sekulić (SRB)
20 June 2025; 11:45	Souza 4	(14–23)	Kofler, Möstl 5	Orlen Arena, Płock; Attendance: 100; Referees: Jovandić, Sekulić (SRB)
20 June 2025; 11:45	1× (yellow card) 4× (suspension)	Report		Orlen Arena, Płock; Attendance: 100; Referees: Jovandić, Sekulić (SRB)

20 June 2025; 14:00	Hungary	36–31	Argentina	Orlen Arena, Płock; Attendance: 100; Referees: Thiyagarajah, Thiyagarajah (GER)
20 June 2025; 14:00	Tóth 7	(16–13)	Ojea 6	Orlen Arena, Płock; Attendance: 100; Referees: Thiyagarajah, Thiyagarajah (GER)
20 June 2025; 14:00	8× (suspension)	Report	2× (yellow card) 7× (suspension)	Orlen Arena, Płock; Attendance: 100; Referees: Thiyagarajah, Thiyagarajah (GER)

21 June 2025; 11:45	Argentina	30–29	Brazil	Orlen Arena, Płock; Attendance: 100; Referees: Carmaux, Mursch (FRA)
21 June 2025; 11:45	Obregón, Rodríguez 9	(14–14)	three players 5	Orlen Arena, Płock; Attendance: 100; Referees: Carmaux, Mursch (FRA)
21 June 2025; 11:45	5× (suspension)	Report	4× (suspension) 1× (red card)	Orlen Arena, Płock; Attendance: 100; Referees: Carmaux, Mursch (FRA)

21 June 2025; 14:00	Austria	22–21	Hungary	Orlen Arena, Płock; Attendance: 150; Referees: Diop, Faye (SEN)
21 June 2025; 14:00	Möstl 8	(10–14)	Kovács 6	Orlen Arena, Płock; Attendance: 150; Referees: Diop, Faye (SEN)
21 June 2025; 14:00	2× (suspension)	Report	2× (yellow card) 7× (suspension)	Orlen Arena, Płock; Attendance: 150; Referees: Diop, Faye (SEN)

=== Group C ===
Pos	Team	Pld	W	D	L	GF	GA	GD	Pts	Qualification
1	Sweden	3	3	0	0	119	81	+38	6	Main round
2	Japan	3	2	0	1	105	99	+6	4	Main round
3	South Korea	3	1	0	2	94	110	−16	2	President's Cup
4	United States	3	0	0	3	87	115	−28	0	President's Cup

Source: IHF
Rules for classification: 1) points; 2) head-to-head points; 3) head-to-head goal difference; 4) head-to-head number of goals scored; 5) goal difference.

18 June 2025; 16:15	Sweden	42–31	South Korea	Arena Sosnowiec - ArcelorMittal Park, Sosnowiec; Attendance: 726; Referees: Paolantoni, García (ARG)
18 June 2025; 16:15	Eriksson, Månsson 8	(20–14)	Lee H., Moon 6	Arena Sosnowiec - ArcelorMittal Park, Sosnowiec; Attendance: 726; Referees: Paolantoni, García (ARG)
18 June 2025; 16:15	1× (yellow card) 5× (suspension)	Report	2× (suspension)	Arena Sosnowiec - ArcelorMittal Park, Sosnowiec; Attendance: 726; Referees: Paolantoni, García (ARG)

18 June 2025; 18:30	Japan	41–33	United States	Arena Sosnowiec - ArcelorMittal Park, Sosnowiec; Attendance: 726; Referees: Nygaard, Primdahl (DEN)
18 June 2025; 18:30	Furukawa 6	(20–10)	McCauley 8	Arena Sosnowiec - ArcelorMittal Park, Sosnowiec; Attendance: 726; Referees: Nygaard, Primdahl (DEN)
18 June 2025; 18:30	2× (suspension)	Report	5× (suspension)	Arena Sosnowiec - ArcelorMittal Park, Sosnowiec; Attendance: 726; Referees: Nygaard, Primdahl (DEN)

20 June 2025; 16:15	United States	21–39	Sweden	Arena Sosnowiec - ArcelorMittal Park, Sosnowiec; Attendance: 630; Referees: Soria, Álvarez (ESP)
20 June 2025; 16:15	Campos 4	(10–19)	Gustavsson 9	Arena Sosnowiec - ArcelorMittal Park, Sosnowiec; Attendance: 630; Referees: Soria, Álvarez (ESP)
20 June 2025; 16:15	3× (suspension)	Report	1× (yellow card) 1× (suspension)	Arena Sosnowiec - ArcelorMittal Park, Sosnowiec; Attendance: 630; Referees: Soria, Álvarez (ESP)

20 June 2025; 18:30	Japan	35–28	South Korea	Arena Sosnowiec - ArcelorMittal Park, Sosnowiec; Attendance: 630; Referees: Altmár, Horváth (HUN)
20 June 2025; 18:30	Nagamori 10	(22–15)	Lee M. 8	Arena Sosnowiec - ArcelorMittal Park, Sosnowiec; Attendance: 630; Referees: Altmár, Horváth (HUN)
20 June 2025; 18:30	1× (yellow card) 2× (suspension)	Report	5× (suspension)	Arena Sosnowiec - ArcelorMittal Park, Sosnowiec; Attendance: 630; Referees: Altmár, Horváth (HUN)

21 June 2025; 16:15	South Korea	35–33	United States	Arena Sosnowiec - ArcelorMittal Park, Sosnowiec; Attendance: 504; Referees: Fotakidis, Kinatzidis (GRE)
21 June 2025; 16:15	Lee M. 6	(19–11)	Neumaier 9	Arena Sosnowiec - ArcelorMittal Park, Sosnowiec; Attendance: 504; Referees: Fotakidis, Kinatzidis (GRE)
21 June 2025; 16:15	2× (suspension)	Report	5× (suspension)	Arena Sosnowiec - ArcelorMittal Park, Sosnowiec; Attendance: 504; Referees: Fotakidis, Kinatzidis (GRE)

21 June 2025; 18:30	Sweden	38–29	Japan	Arena Sosnowiec - ArcelorMittal Park, Sosnowiec; Attendance: 504; Referees: Mitrović, Vešović (MNE)
21 June 2025; 18:30	Månsson 10	(20–12)	Nagamori 10	Arena Sosnowiec - ArcelorMittal Park, Sosnowiec; Attendance: 504; Referees: Mitrović, Vešović (MNE)
21 June 2025; 18:30	3× (yellow card) 6× (suspension)	Report	3× (suspension)	Arena Sosnowiec - ArcelorMittal Park, Sosnowiec; Attendance: 504; Referees: Mitrović, Vešović (MNE)

=== Group D ===
Pos	Team	Pld	W	D	L	GF	GA	GD	Pts	Qualification
1	Portugal	3	3	0	0	108	58	+50	6	Main round
2	Croatia	3	2	0	1	104	74	+30	4	Main round
3	Algeria	3	1	0	2	78	88	−10	2	President's Cup
4	Canada	3	0	0	3	52	122	−70	0	President's Cup

Source: IHF
Rules for classification: 1) points; 2) head-to-head points; 3) head-to-head goal difference; 4) head-to-head number of goals scored; 5) goal difference.

18 June 2025; 11:45	Portugal	33–21	Algeria	Arena Sosnowiec - ArcelorMittal Park, Sosnowiec; Attendance: 726; Referees: Fotakidis, Kinatzidis (GRE)
18 June 2025; 11:45	Conceição 6	(18–11)	Adel 11	Arena Sosnowiec - ArcelorMittal Park, Sosnowiec; Attendance: 726; Referees: Fotakidis, Kinatzidis (GRE)
18 June 2025; 11:45	4× (suspension)	Report	2× (yellow card) 6× (suspension)	Arena Sosnowiec - ArcelorMittal Park, Sosnowiec; Attendance: 726; Referees: Fotakidis, Kinatzidis (GRE)

18 June 2025; 14:00	Croatia	44–20	Canada	Arena Sosnowiec - ArcelorMittal Park, Sosnowiec; Attendance: 726; Referees: Soria, Álvarez (ESP)
18 June 2025; 14:00	Celegin 8	(21–12)	Kuypers 8	Arena Sosnowiec - ArcelorMittal Park, Sosnowiec; Attendance: 726; Referees: Soria, Álvarez (ESP)
18 June 2025; 14:00	1× (yellow card) 3× (suspension)	Report	2× (suspension)	Arena Sosnowiec - ArcelorMittal Park, Sosnowiec; Attendance: 726; Referees: Soria, Álvarez (ESP)

20 June 2025; 11:45	Canada	12–45	Portugal	Arena Sosnowiec - ArcelorMittal Park, Sosnowiec; Attendance: 630; Referees: Weijmans, Wolbertus (NED)
20 June 2025; 11:45	Desbiens, Kuypers 3	(6–24)	Ferreira 13	Arena Sosnowiec - ArcelorMittal Park, Sosnowiec; Attendance: 630; Referees: Weijmans, Wolbertus (NED)
20 June 2025; 11:45	3× (suspension)	Report	1× (suspension)	Arena Sosnowiec - ArcelorMittal Park, Sosnowiec; Attendance: 630; Referees: Weijmans, Wolbertus (NED)

20 June 2025; 14:00	Croatia	35–24	Algeria	Arena Sosnowiec - ArcelorMittal Park, Sosnowiec; Attendance: 630; Referees: Paolantoni, García (ARG)
20 June 2025; 14:00	Bajan 5	(18–7)	Youcef 9	Arena Sosnowiec - ArcelorMittal Park, Sosnowiec; Attendance: 630; Referees: Paolantoni, García (ARG)
20 June 2025; 14:00	2× (yellow card) 2× (suspension) 1× (red card)	Report	4× (suspension)	Arena Sosnowiec - ArcelorMittal Park, Sosnowiec; Attendance: 630; Referees: Paolantoni, García (ARG)

21 June 2025; 11:45	Algeria	33–20	Canada	Arena Sosnowiec - ArcelorMittal Park, Sosnowiec; Attendance: 504; Referees: Furukawa, Murata (JPN)
21 June 2025; 11:45	Faidi, Zhoual 5	(14–7)	Kuypers 6	Arena Sosnowiec - ArcelorMittal Park, Sosnowiec; Attendance: 504; Referees: Furukawa, Murata (JPN)
21 June 2025; 11:45	3× (suspension)	Report	1× (suspension)	Arena Sosnowiec - ArcelorMittal Park, Sosnowiec; Attendance: 504; Referees: Furukawa, Murata (JPN)

21 June 2025; 14:00	Portugal	30–25	Croatia	Arena Sosnowiec - ArcelorMittal Park, Sosnowiec; Attendance: 504; Referees: Fremstad, Jørstad (NOR)
21 June 2025; 14:00	Brandão 6	(11–13)	Bajan, Molc 5	Arena Sosnowiec - ArcelorMittal Park, Sosnowiec; Attendance: 504; Referees: Fremstad, Jørstad (NOR)
21 June 2025; 14:00	4× (suspension)	Report	3× (suspension)	Arena Sosnowiec - ArcelorMittal Park, Sosnowiec; Attendance: 504; Referees: Fremstad, Jørstad (NOR)

=== Group E ===
Pos	Team	Pld	W	D	L	GF	GA	GD	Pts	Qualification
1	Denmark	3	3	0	0	126	82	+44	6	Main round
2	France	3	2	0	1	112	80	+32	4	Main round
3	Morocco	3	1	0	2	97	101	−4	2	President's Cup
4	Mexico	3	0	0	3	60	132	−72	0	President's Cup

Source: IHF
Rules for classification: 1) points; 2) head-to-head points; 3) head-to-head goal difference; 4) head-to-head number of goals scored; 5) goal difference.

18 June 2025; 16:15	Denmark	43–31	Morocco	Arena Katowice, Katowice; Attendance: 250; Referees: Weijmans, Wolbertus (NED)
18 June 2025; 16:15	M. Pedersen 8	(21–18)	Mansari 8	Arena Katowice, Katowice; Attendance: 250; Referees: Weijmans, Wolbertus (NED)
18 June 2025; 16:15	1× (yellow card) 1× (suspension)	Report	1× (yellow card) 2× (suspension)	Arena Katowice, Katowice; Attendance: 250; Referees: Weijmans, Wolbertus (NED)

18 June 2025; 18:30	France	46–17	Mexico	Arena Katowice, Katowice; Attendance: 290; Referees: Furukawa, Murata (JPN)
18 June 2025; 18:30	Tighioart 10	(23–8)	Carreño, Rivas 4	Arena Katowice, Katowice; Attendance: 290; Referees: Furukawa, Murata (JPN)
18 June 2025; 18:30	3× (suspension)	Report	2× (suspension)	Arena Katowice, Katowice; Attendance: 290; Referees: Furukawa, Murata (JPN)

19 June 2025; 16:15	Mexico	20–48	Denmark	Arena Katowice, Katowice; Attendance: 250; Referees: Mitrović, Vešović (MNE)
19 June 2025; 16:15	Maya 7	(8–22)	M. Pedersen 14	Arena Katowice, Katowice; Attendance: 250; Referees: Mitrović, Vešović (MNE)
19 June 2025; 16:15	3× (suspension) 1× (red card)	Report	3× (suspension)	Arena Katowice, Katowice; Attendance: 250; Referees: Mitrović, Vešović (MNE)

19 June 2025; 18:30	France	35–28	Morocco	Arena Katowice, Katowice; Attendance: 240; Referees: Pukšič, Satler (SLO)
19 June 2025; 18:30	Tighioart 9	(18–15)	Razgui 8	Arena Katowice, Katowice; Attendance: 240; Referees: Pukšič, Satler (SLO)
19 June 2025; 18:30	3× (suspension)	Report	6× (suspension)	Arena Katowice, Katowice; Attendance: 240; Referees: Pukšič, Satler (SLO)

21 June 2025; 16:15	Morocco	38–23	Mexico	Arena Katowice, Katowice; Attendance: 290; Referees: Nygaard, Primdahl (DEN)
21 June 2025; 16:15	Saa 8	(19–9)	Maya 7	Arena Katowice, Katowice; Attendance: 290; Referees: Nygaard, Primdahl (DEN)
21 June 2025; 16:15	1× (suspension)	Report	1× (suspension)	Arena Katowice, Katowice; Attendance: 290; Referees: Nygaard, Primdahl (DEN)

21 June 2025; 18:30	Denmark	35–31	France	Arena Katowice, Katowice; Attendance: 740; Referees: Fabryczny, Rawicki (POL)
21 June 2025; 18:30	Larsson 8	(18–16)	Claude 6	Arena Katowice, Katowice; Attendance: 740; Referees: Fabryczny, Rawicki (POL)
21 June 2025; 18:30	1× (yellow card) 5× (suspension)	Report	1× (yellow card) 7× (suspension) 1× (red card)	Arena Katowice, Katowice; Attendance: 740; Referees: Fabryczny, Rawicki (POL)

=== Group F ===
Pos	Team	Pld	W	D	L	GF	GA	GD	Pts	Qualification
1	Faroe Islands	3	2	1	0	103	91	+12	5	Main round
2	Romania	3	2	0	1	85	87	−2	4	Main round
3	Iceland	3	1	1	1	94	92	+2	3	President's Cup
4	North Macedonia	3	0	0	3	83	95	−12	0	President's Cup

Source: IHF
Rules for classification: 1) points; 2) head-to-head points; 3) head-to-head goal difference; 4) head-to-head number of goals scored; 5) goal difference.

18 June 2025; 11:45	Iceland	25–29	Romania	Arena Katowice, Katowice; Attendance: 504; Referees: Mitrović, Vešović (MNE)
18 June 2025; 11:45	B. Steinsson 5	(12–15)	Stanciuc 11	Arena Katowice, Katowice; Attendance: 504; Referees: Mitrović, Vešović (MNE)
18 June 2025; 11:45	2× (suspension)	Report	1× (yellow card) 3× (suspension)	Arena Katowice, Katowice; Attendance: 504; Referees: Mitrović, Vešović (MNE)

18 June 2025; 14:00	North Macedonia	28–33	Faroe Islands	Arena Katowice, Katowice; Attendance: 575; Referees: Altmár, Horváth (HUN)
18 June 2025; 14:00	Kalajdjeski, Lizunchev 6	(15–16)	Mittún 15	Arena Katowice, Katowice; Attendance: 575; Referees: Altmár, Horváth (HUN)
18 June 2025; 14:00	1× (yellow card) 8× (suspension)	Report	4× (suspension)	Arena Katowice, Katowice; Attendance: 575; Referees: Altmár, Horváth (HUN)

19 June 2025; 11:45	Faroe Islands	35–35	Iceland	Arena Katowice, Katowice; Attendance: 255; Referees: Sosa, Lemes (URU)
19 June 2025; 11:45	Mittún 11	(21–19)	Erlingsson 17	Arena Katowice, Katowice; Attendance: 255; Referees: Sosa, Lemes (URU)
19 June 2025; 11:45	2× (suspension)	Report	2× (yellow card) 4× (suspension) 1× (red card)	Arena Katowice, Katowice; Attendance: 255; Referees: Sosa, Lemes (URU)

19 June 2025; 14:00	North Macedonia	27–28	Romania	Arena Katowice, Katowice; Attendance: 320; Referees: Fabryczny, Rawicki (POL)
19 June 2025; 14:00	Uzunchev 7	(17–12)	Stanciuc 13	Arena Katowice, Katowice; Attendance: 320; Referees: Fabryczny, Rawicki (POL)
19 June 2025; 14:00	6× (suspension)	Report	1× (yellow card) 1× (red card)	Arena Katowice, Katowice; Attendance: 320; Referees: Fabryczny, Rawicki (POL)

21 June 2025; 11:45	Romania	28–35	Faroe Islands	Arena Katowice, Katowice; Attendance: 285; Referees: Altmár, Horváth (HUN)
21 June 2025; 11:45	Stanciuc 7	(15–8)	Mittún 9	Arena Katowice, Katowice; Attendance: 285; Referees: Altmár, Horváth (HUN)
21 June 2025; 11:45	7× (suspension)	Report	4× (suspension) 1× (red card)	Arena Katowice, Katowice; Attendance: 285; Referees: Altmár, Horváth (HUN)

21 June 2025; 14:00	Iceland	34–28	North Macedonia	Arena Katowice, Katowice; Attendance: 290; Referees: Budzák, Záhradník (SVK)
21 June 2025; 14:00	Erlingsson 9	(15–14)	Uzunchev 10	Arena Katowice, Katowice; Attendance: 290; Referees: Budzák, Záhradník (SVK)
21 June 2025; 14:00	1× (yellow card) 4× (suspension)	Report	1× (yellow card) 5× (suspension)	Arena Katowice, Katowice; Attendance: 290; Referees: Budzák, Záhradník (SVK)

=== Group G ===
Pos	Team	Pld	W	D	L	GF	GA	GD	Pts	Qualification
1	Germany	3	3	0	0	112	88	+24	6	Main round
2	Switzerland	3	2	0	1	104	102	+2	4	Main round
3	Serbia	3	1	0	2	95	93	+2	2	President's Cup
4	Tunisia	3	0	0	3	90	118	−28	0	President's Cup

Source: IHF
Rules for classification: 1) points; 2) head-to-head points; 3) head-to-head goal difference; 4) head-to-head number of goals scored; 5) goal difference.

18 June 2025; 18:45	Tunisia	31–41	Switzerland	Hala Legionów, Kielce; Attendance: 172; Referees: Konjičanin, Konjičanin (BIH)
18 June 2025; 18:45	Ben Fraj 12	(17–21)	Sarlos 10	Hala Legionów, Kielce; Attendance: 172; Referees: Konjičanin, Konjičanin (BIH)
18 June 2025; 18:45	7× (suspension)	Report	1× (yellow card) 4× (suspension)	Hala Legionów, Kielce; Attendance: 172; Referees: Konjičanin, Konjičanin (BIH)

18 June 2025; 21:00	Germany	30–29	Serbia	Hala Legionów, Kielce; Attendance: 292; Referees: Fremstad, Jørstad (NOR)
18 June 2025; 21:00	Schmidt 10	(14–12)	Mitrović 7	Hala Legionów, Kielce; Attendance: 292; Referees: Fremstad, Jørstad (NOR)
18 June 2025; 21:00	1× (yellow card) 7× (suspension)	Report	1× (yellow card) 4× (suspension) 1× (red card)	Hala Legionów, Kielce; Attendance: 292; Referees: Fremstad, Jørstad (NOR)

19 June 2025; 18:45	Tunisia	33–38	Serbia	Hala Legionów, Kielce; Attendance: 201; Referees: Pagh, Thygesen (DEN)
19 June 2025; 18:45	Jmour 6	(10–18)	Mitrović 7	Hala Legionów, Kielce; Attendance: 201; Referees: Pagh, Thygesen (DEN)
19 June 2025; 18:45	7× (suspension)	Report	1× (yellow card) 4× (suspension) 1× (red card)	Hala Legionów, Kielce; Attendance: 201; Referees: Pagh, Thygesen (DEN)

19 June 2025; 21:00	Switzerland	33–43	Germany	Hala Legionów, Kielce; Attendance: 347; Referees: Bozhinovski, Nachevski (MKD)
19 June 2025; 21:00	Cuencas, Sigrist 6	(14–21)	Gömmel, Pabst 8	Hala Legionów, Kielce; Attendance: 347; Referees: Bozhinovski, Nachevski (MKD)
19 June 2025; 21:00	3× (suspension)	Report	5× (suspension)	Hala Legionów, Kielce; Attendance: 347; Referees: Bozhinovski, Nachevski (MKD)

21 June 2025; 18:45	Serbia	28–30	Switzerland	Hala Legionów, Kielce; Attendance: 291; Referees: Sosa, Lemes (URU)
21 June 2025; 18:45	Milovanović, Šijan 6	(14–17)	Sigrist 11	Hala Legionów, Kielce; Attendance: 291; Referees: Sosa, Lemes (URU)
21 June 2025; 18:45	2× (yellow card) 3× (suspension)	Report	2× (yellow card) 2× (suspension)	Hala Legionów, Kielce; Attendance: 291; Referees: Sosa, Lemes (URU)

21 June 2025; 21:00	Germany	39–26	Tunisia	Hala Legionów, Kielce; Attendance: 187; Referees: Pukšič, Satler (SLO)
21 June 2025; 21:00	Günther 8	(19–11)	Ben Abdennebi 7	Hala Legionów, Kielce; Attendance: 187; Referees: Pukšič, Satler (SLO)
21 June 2025; 21:00	7× (suspension)	Report	1× (yellow card) 7× (suspension)	Hala Legionów, Kielce; Attendance: 187; Referees: Pukšič, Satler (SLO)

=== Group H ===
Pos	Team	Pld	W	D	L	GF	GA	GD	Pts	Qualification
1	Egypt	3	3	0	0	93	78	+15	6	Main round
2	Spain	3	2	0	1	104	76	+28	4	Main round
3	Bahrain	3	1	0	2	64	92	−28	2	President's Cup
4	Saudi Arabia	3	0	0	3	81	96	−15	0	President's Cup

Source: IHF
Rules for classification: 1) points; 2) head-to-head points; 3) head-to-head goal difference; 4) head-to-head number of goals scored; 5) goal difference.

18 June 2025; 11:45	Spain	40–19	Bahrain	Hala Legionów, Kielce; Attendance: 1,109; Referees: Pagh, Thygesen (DEN)
18 June 2025; 11:45	Romero 6	(21–12)	E. Ali 6	Hala Legionów, Kielce; Attendance: 1,109; Referees: Pagh, Thygesen (DEN)
18 June 2025; 11:45	3× (suspension)	Report	3× (suspension)	Hala Legionów, Kielce; Attendance: 1,109; Referees: Pagh, Thygesen (DEN)

18 June 2025; 14:00	Egypt	35–30	Saudi Arabia	Hala Legionów, Kielce; Attendance: 148; Referees: Bozhinovski, Nachevski (MKD)
18 June 2025; 14:00	Salem 6	(19–15)	Furaij 7	Hala Legionów, Kielce; Attendance: 148; Referees: Bozhinovski, Nachevski (MKD)
18 June 2025; 14:00	4× (suspension)	Report	5× (suspension)	Hala Legionów, Kielce; Attendance: 148; Referees: Bozhinovski, Nachevski (MKD)

19 June 2025; 11:45	Saudi Arabia	27–35	Spain	Hala Legionów, Kielce; Attendance: 217; Referees: Fremstad, Jørstad (NOR)
19 June 2025; 11:45	Al-Fardan, Al-Obaidi 4	(9–20)	Barrufet 8	Hala Legionów, Kielce; Attendance: 217; Referees: Fremstad, Jørstad (NOR)
19 June 2025; 11:45	5× (suspension)	Report	1× (yellow card) 2× (suspension)	Hala Legionów, Kielce; Attendance: 217; Referees: Fremstad, Jørstad (NOR)

19 June 2025; 14:00	Egypt	28–19	Bahrain	Hala Legionów, Kielce; Attendance: 102; Referees: Budzák, Záhradník (SVK)
19 June 2025; 14:00	Mahmoud, Ragab 5	(14–10)	E. Ali 6	Hala Legionów, Kielce; Attendance: 102; Referees: Budzák, Záhradník (SVK)
19 June 2025; 14:00	1× (yellow card) 7× (suspension)	Report	4× (suspension)	Hala Legionów, Kielce; Attendance: 102; Referees: Budzák, Záhradník (SVK)

21 June 2025; 11:45	Bahrain	26–24	Saudi Arabia	Hala Legionów, Kielce; Attendance: 104; Referees: Pagh, Thygesen (DEN)
21 June 2025; 11:45	Yusuf 7	(12–13)	Al-Qaid 5	Hala Legionów, Kielce; Attendance: 104; Referees: Pagh, Thygesen (DEN)
21 June 2025; 11:45	5× (suspension) 1× (red card)	Report	4× (suspension)	Hala Legionów, Kielce; Attendance: 104; Referees: Pagh, Thygesen (DEN)

21 June 2025; 14:00	Spain	29–30	Egypt	Hala Legionów, Kielce; Attendance: 284; Referees: Konjičanin, Konjičanin (BIH)
21 June 2025; 14:00	Cikusa 6	(16–16)	Azab, Khallaf 7	Hala Legionów, Kielce; Attendance: 284; Referees: Konjičanin, Konjičanin (BIH)
21 June 2025; 14:00	1× (yellow card) 3× (suspension)	Report	1× (yellow card) 6× (suspension) 1× (red card)	Hala Legionów, Kielce; Attendance: 284; Referees: Konjičanin, Konjičanin (BIH)

== President's Cup ==
Points obtained in the matches against the team from the group are taken over.

=== Group I ===
Pos	Team	Pld	W	D	L	GF	GA	GD	Pts	Qualification
1	Poland	3	3	0	0	103	74	+29	6	17–20th place semifinals
2	Argentina	3	2	0	1	97	78	+19	4	21st–24th place semifinals
3	Brazil	3	1	0	2	85	77	+8	2	25–28th place semifinals
4	Uruguay	3	0	0	3	48	104	−56	0	29th–32nd place semifinals

Source: IHF
Rules for classification: 1) points; 2) head-to-head points; 3) head-to-head goal difference; 4) head-to-head number of goals scored; 5) goal difference.

23 June 2025; 16:15	Argentina	35–16	Uruguay	Orlen Arena, Płock; Attendance: 50; Referees: Balvan, Praštalo (BIH)
23 June 2025; 16:15	Laborde, Tavella 5	(17–8)	Cabrera 7	Orlen Arena, Płock; Attendance: 50; Referees: Balvan, Praštalo (BIH)
23 June 2025; 16:15	4× (suspension)	Report	2× (yellow card) 3× (suspension)	Orlen Arena, Płock; Attendance: 50; Referees: Balvan, Praštalo (BIH)

23 June 2025; 18:30	Poland	31–26	Brazil	Orlen Arena, Płock; Attendance: 300; Referees: Diop, Faye (SEN)
23 June 2025; 18:30	Wasiak 7	(17–13)	Bertoldo 8	Orlen Arena, Płock; Attendance: 300; Referees: Diop, Faye (SEN)
23 June 2025; 18:30	4× (suspension)	Report	6× (suspension) 2× (red card)	Orlen Arena, Płock; Attendance: 300; Referees: Diop, Faye (SEN)

24 June 2025; 16:15	Uruguay	16–30	Brazil	Orlen Arena, Płock; Attendance: 80; Referees: Budzák, Záhradník (SVK)
24 June 2025; 16:15	Fernández 4	(9–19)	Perin 5	Orlen Arena, Płock; Attendance: 80; Referees: Budzák, Záhradník (SVK)
24 June 2025; 16:15	1× (yellow card) 3× (suspension)	Report	5× (suspension)	Orlen Arena, Płock; Attendance: 80; Referees: Budzák, Záhradník (SVK)

24 June 2025; 18:30	Poland	33–32	Argentina	Orlen Arena, Płock; Attendance: 200; Referees: Thiyagarajah, Thiyagarajah (GER)
24 June 2025; 18:30	Wasiak 7	(15–12)	Obregón 6	Orlen Arena, Płock; Attendance: 200; Referees: Thiyagarajah, Thiyagarajah (GER)
24 June 2025; 18:30	4× (suspension)	Report	1× (yellow card) 5× (suspension)	Orlen Arena, Płock; Attendance: 200; Referees: Thiyagarajah, Thiyagarajah (GER)

=== Group II ===
Pos	Team	Pld	W	D	L	GF	GA	GD	Pts	Qualification
1	Algeria	3	2	1	0	83	64	+19	5 (Note: South Korea 24–24 Algeria)	17–20th place semifinals
2	South Korea	3	2	1	0	101	86	+15	5	21st–24th place semifinals
3	United States	3	1	0	2	92	84	+8	2	25–28th place semifinals
4	Canada	3	0	0	3	72	114	−42	0	29th–32nd place semifinals

Source: IHF
Rules for classification: 1) points; 2) head-to-head points; 3) head-to-head goal difference; 4) head-to-head number of goals scored; 5) goal difference.
Notes:

23 June 2025; 11:45	South Korea	42–29	Canada	Arena Sosnowiec - ArcelorMittal Park, Sosnowiec; Attendance: 627; Referees: Soria, Álvarez (ESP)
23 June 2025; 11:45	Kang S. 10	(22–10)	Kuypers 10	Arena Sosnowiec - ArcelorMittal Park, Sosnowiec; Attendance: 627; Referees: Soria, Álvarez (ESP)
23 June 2025; 11:45	2× (suspension)	Report	4× (suspension)	Arena Sosnowiec - ArcelorMittal Park, Sosnowiec; Attendance: 627; Referees: Soria, Álvarez (ESP)

23 June 2025; 14:00	Algeria	26–20	United States	Arena Sosnowiec - ArcelorMittal Park, Sosnowiec; Attendance: 627; Referees: Furukawa, Murata (JPN)
23 June 2025; 14:00	Adel 7	(12–9)	Edwards 8	Arena Sosnowiec - ArcelorMittal Park, Sosnowiec; Attendance: 627; Referees: Furukawa, Murata (JPN)
23 June 2025; 14:00	7× (suspension)	Report	2× (suspension)	Arena Sosnowiec - ArcelorMittal Park, Sosnowiec; Attendance: 627; Referees: Furukawa, Murata (JPN)

24 June 2025; 11:45	South Korea	24–24	Algeria	Arena Sosnowiec - ArcelorMittal Park, Sosnowiec; Attendance: 425; Referees: Weijmans, Wolbertus (NED)
24 June 2025; 11:45	Lee M. 8	(14–13)	Youcef 7	Arena Sosnowiec - ArcelorMittal Park, Sosnowiec; Attendance: 425; Referees: Weijmans, Wolbertus (NED)
24 June 2025; 11:45	3× (suspension)	Report	6× (suspension)	Arena Sosnowiec - ArcelorMittal Park, Sosnowiec; Attendance: 425; Referees: Weijmans, Wolbertus (NED)

24 June 2025; 14:00	United States	39–23	Canada	Arena Sosnowiec - ArcelorMittal Park, Sosnowiec; Attendance: 425; Referees: Fotakidis, Kinatzidis (GRE)
24 June 2025; 14:00	Edwards 6	(19–10)	Kuypers 7	Arena Sosnowiec - ArcelorMittal Park, Sosnowiec; Attendance: 425; Referees: Fotakidis, Kinatzidis (GRE)
24 June 2025; 14:00	4× (suspension)	Report	6× (suspension)	Arena Sosnowiec - ArcelorMittal Park, Sosnowiec; Attendance: 425; Referees: Fotakidis, Kinatzidis (GRE)

=== Group III ===
Pos	Team	Pld	W	D	L	GF	GA	GD	Pts	Qualification
1	Iceland	3	3	0	0	123	80	+43	6	17–20th place semifinals
2	Morocco	3	2	0	1	96	97	−1	4	21st–24th place semifinals
3	North Macedonia	3	1	0	2	95	85	+10	2	25–28th place semifinals
4	Mexico	3	0	0	3	68	120	−52	0	29th–32nd place semifinals

Source: IHF
Rules for classification: 1) points; 2) head-to-head points; 3) head-to-head goal difference; 4) head-to-head number of goals scored; 5) goal difference.

23 June 2025; 11:45	Morocco	30–26	North Macedonia	Arena Katowice, Katowice; Attendance: 295; Referees: Altmár, Horváth (HUN)
23 June 2025; 11:45	Mansari 6	(14–12)	Uzunchev 6	Arena Katowice, Katowice; Attendance: 295; Referees: Altmár, Horváth (HUN)
23 June 2025; 11:45	4× (suspension)	Report	3× (suspension)	Arena Katowice, Katowice; Attendance: 295; Referees: Altmár, Horváth (HUN)

23 June 2025; 14:00	Iceland	41–24	Mexico	Arena Katowice, Katowice; Attendance: 245; Referees: Fotakidis, Kinatzidis (GRE)
23 June 2025; 14:00	Sigurjónsson 8	(16–8)	Flores 5	Arena Katowice, Katowice; Attendance: 245; Referees: Fotakidis, Kinatzidis (GRE)
23 June 2025; 14:00	1× (suspension)	Report	3× (suspension)	Arena Katowice, Katowice; Attendance: 245; Referees: Fotakidis, Kinatzidis (GRE)

24 June 2025; 11:45	Morocco	28–48	Iceland	Arena Katowice, Katowice; Attendance: 409; Referees: Soria, Álvarez (ESP)
24 June 2025; 11:45	Razgui 7	(15–20)	Haraldsson 11	Arena Katowice, Katowice; Attendance: 409; Referees: Soria, Álvarez (ESP)
24 June 2025; 11:45	3× (suspension) 1× (red card)	Report	1× (yellow card) 4× (suspension)	Arena Katowice, Katowice; Attendance: 409; Referees: Soria, Álvarez (ESP)

24 June 2025; 14:00	Mexico	21–41	North Macedonia	Arena Katowice, Katowice; Attendance: 160; Referees: Furukawa, Murata (JPN)
24 June 2025; 14:00	Anguiano 6	(9–21)	Subashevski 12	Arena Katowice, Katowice; Attendance: 160; Referees: Furukawa, Murata (JPN)
24 June 2025; 14:00	4× (suspension)	Report	3× (suspension)	Arena Katowice, Katowice; Attendance: 160; Referees: Furukawa, Murata (JPN)

=== Group IV ===
Pos	Team	Pld	W	D	L	GF	GA	GD	Pts	Qualification
1	Serbia	3	3	0	0	109	95	+14	6	17–20th place semifinals
2	Tunisia	3	2	0	1	107	96	+11	4	21st–24th place semifinals
3	Bahrain	3	1	0	2	85	99	−14	2	25–28th place semifinals
4	Saudi Arabia	3	0	0	3	85	96	−11	0	29th–32nd place semifinals

Source: IHF
Rules for classification: 1) points; 2) head-to-head points; 3) head-to-head goal difference; 4) head-to-head number of goals scored; 5) goal difference.

23 June 2025; 11:45	Serbia	35–30	Saudi Arabia	Hala Legionów, Kielce; Attendance: 765; Referees: Fremstad, Jørstad (NOR)
23 June 2025; 11:45	Rančić 11	(20–15)	Baydhi 7	Hala Legionów, Kielce; Attendance: 765; Referees: Fremstad, Jørstad (NOR)
23 June 2025; 11:45	1× (suspension)	Report	2× (suspension)	Hala Legionów, Kielce; Attendance: 765; Referees: Fremstad, Jørstad (NOR)

23 June 2025; 14:00	Bahrain	27–39	Tunisia	Hala Legionów, Kielce; Attendance: 65; Referees: Pukšič, Satler (SLO)
23 June 2025; 14:00	E. Ali 6	(14–23)	Ben Fraj 7	Hala Legionów, Kielce; Attendance: 65; Referees: Pukšič, Satler (SLO)
23 June 2025; 14:00	4× (suspension)	Report	6× (suspension)	Hala Legionów, Kielce; Attendance: 65; Referees: Pukšič, Satler (SLO)

24 June 2025; 11:45	Serbia	36–32	Bahrain	Hala Legionów, Kielce; Attendance: 705; Referees: Carmaux, Mursch (FRA)
24 June 2025; 11:45	Antonijević 8	(19–15)	E. Ali 10	Hala Legionów, Kielce; Attendance: 705; Referees: Carmaux, Mursch (FRA)
24 June 2025; 11:45	4× (suspension)	Report	1× (suspension)	Hala Legionów, Kielce; Attendance: 705; Referees: Carmaux, Mursch (FRA)

24 June 2025; 14:00	Tunisia	35–31	Saudi Arabia	Hala Legionów, Kielce; Attendance: 134; Referees: Bozhinovski, Nachevski (MKD)
24 June 2025; 14:00	Jafali 8	(18–17)	Al-Fardan 8	Hala Legionów, Kielce; Attendance: 134; Referees: Bozhinovski, Nachevski (MKD)
24 June 2025; 14:00	2× (suspension) 1× (red card)	Report	3× (suspension) 1× (red card)	Hala Legionów, Kielce; Attendance: 134; Referees: Bozhinovski, Nachevski (MKD)

== Main round ==
Points obtained in the matches against the team from the group are taken over.

=== Group I ===
Pos	Team	Pld	W	D	L	GF	GA	GD	Pts	Qualification
1	Slovenia	3	2	1	0	98	91	+7	5	Quarterfinals
2	Norway	3	1	2	0	97	93	+4	4	Quarterfinals
3	Austria	3	1	1	1	76	76	0	3	9–12th place semifinals
4	Hungary	3	0	0	3	85	96	−11	0	13–16th place semifinals

Source: IHF
Rules for classification: 1) points; 2) head-to-head points; 3) head-to-head goal difference; 4) head-to-head number of goals scored; 5) goal difference.

23 June 2025; 11:45	Norway	37–33	Hungary	Orlen Arena, Płock; Attendance: 120; Referees: Thiyagarajah, Thiyagarajah (GER)
23 June 2025; 11:45	Iversen 8	(18–13)	Csanálosi, Kovács 5	Orlen Arena, Płock; Attendance: 120; Referees: Thiyagarajah, Thiyagarajah (GER)
23 June 2025; 11:45	3× (suspension)	Report	9× (suspension) 1× (red card)	Orlen Arena, Płock; Attendance: 120; Referees: Thiyagarajah, Thiyagarajah (GER)

23 June 2025; 14:00	Austria	27–28	Slovenia	Orlen Arena, Płock; Attendance: 200; Referees: Budzák, Záhradník (SVK)
23 June 2025; 14:00	Möstl 6	(14–14)	Ključanin 6	Orlen Arena, Płock; Attendance: 200; Referees: Budzák, Záhradník (SVK)
23 June 2025; 14:00	3× (suspension)	Report	1× (yellow card) 1× (suspension) 1× (red card)	Orlen Arena, Płock; Attendance: 200; Referees: Budzák, Záhradník (SVK)

24 June 2025; 11:45	Norway	27–27	Austria	Orlen Arena, Płock; Attendance: 70; Referees: Sekulić, Jovandić (SRB)
24 June 2025; 11:45	Iversen 10	(12–11)	Meleschnig 6	Orlen Arena, Płock; Attendance: 70; Referees: Sekulić, Jovandić (SRB)
24 June 2025; 11:45	2× (yellow card) 5× (suspension)	Report	6× (suspension)	Orlen Arena, Płock; Attendance: 70; Referees: Sekulić, Jovandić (SRB)

24 June 2025; 14:00	Slovenia	37–31	Hungary	Orlen Arena, Płock; Attendance: 130; Referees: Sosa, Lemes (URU)
24 June 2025; 14:00	Anžič 11	(22–15)	Csanálosi 5	Orlen Arena, Płock; Attendance: 130; Referees: Sosa, Lemes (URU)
24 June 2025; 14:00	3× (suspension)	Report	1× (yellow card) 6× (suspension)	Orlen Arena, Płock; Attendance: 130; Referees: Sosa, Lemes (URU)

=== Group II ===
Pos	Team	Pld	W	D	L	GF	GA	GD	Pts	Qualification
1	Portugal	3	3	0	0	107	82	+25	6	Quarterfinals
2	Sweden	3	2	0	1	99	88	+11	4	Quarterfinals
3	Croatia	3	1	0	2	90	94	−4	2	9–12th place semifinals
4	Japan	3	0	0	3	89	121	−32	0	13–16th place semifinals

Source: IHF
Rules for classification: 1) points; 2) head-to-head points; 3) head-to-head goal difference; 4) head-to-head number of goals scored; 5) goal difference.

23 June 2025; 16:15	Sweden	32–28	Croatia	Arena Sosnowiec - ArcelorMittal Park, Sosnowiec; Attendance: 627; Referees: Fabryczny, Rawicki (POL)
23 June 2025; 16:15	Månsson 14	(15–19)	Baković 15	Arena Sosnowiec - ArcelorMittal Park, Sosnowiec; Attendance: 627; Referees: Fabryczny, Rawicki (POL)
23 June 2025; 16:15	1× (yellow card) 2× (suspension)	Report	5× (suspension)	Arena Sosnowiec - ArcelorMittal Park, Sosnowiec; Attendance: 627; Referees: Fabryczny, Rawicki (POL)

23 June 2025; 18:30	Portugal	46–28	Japan	Arena Sosnowiec - ArcelorMittal Park, Sosnowiec; Attendance: 627; Referees: Paolantoni, García (ARG)
23 June 2025; 18:30	Magalhães 7	(23–12)	Nagamori 10	Arena Sosnowiec - ArcelorMittal Park, Sosnowiec; Attendance: 627; Referees: Paolantoni, García (ARG)
23 June 2025; 18:30	4× (suspension)	Report	2× (suspension)	Arena Sosnowiec - ArcelorMittal Park, Sosnowiec; Attendance: 627; Referees: Paolantoni, García (ARG)

24 June 2025; 16:15	Sweden	29–31	Portugal	Arena Sosnowiec - ArcelorMittal Park, Sosnowiec; Attendance: 475; Referees: Konjičanin, Konjičanin (BIH)
24 June 2025; 16:15	Månsson 8	(21–16)	Brandão 6	Arena Sosnowiec - ArcelorMittal Park, Sosnowiec; Attendance: 475; Referees: Konjičanin, Konjičanin (BIH)
24 June 2025; 16:15	4× (suspension)	Report	1× (yellow card) 3× (suspension)	Arena Sosnowiec - ArcelorMittal Park, Sosnowiec; Attendance: 475; Referees: Konjičanin, Konjičanin (BIH)

24 June 2025; 18:30	Japan	32–37	Croatia	Arena Sosnowiec - ArcelorMittal Park, Sosnowiec; Attendance: 457; Referees: Nygaard, Primdahl (DEN)
24 June 2025; 18:30	Nagamori 10	(18–18)	Baković 9	Arena Sosnowiec - ArcelorMittal Park, Sosnowiec; Attendance: 457; Referees: Nygaard, Primdahl (DEN)
24 June 2025; 18:30	1× (yellow card) 3× (suspension)	Report	2× (yellow card) 3× (suspension)	Arena Sosnowiec - ArcelorMittal Park, Sosnowiec; Attendance: 457; Referees: Nygaard, Primdahl (DEN)

=== Group III ===
Pos	Team	Pld	W	D	L	GF	GA	GD	Pts	Qualification
1	Denmark	3	3	0	0	113	93	+20	6	Quarterfinals
2	Faroe Islands	3	2	0	1	95	96	−1	4	Quarterfinals
3	France	3	1	0	2	98	96	+2	2	9–12th place semifinals
4	Romania	3	0	0	3	91	112	−21	0	13–16th place semifinals

Source: IHF
Rules for classification: 1) points; 2) head-to-head points; 3) head-to-head goal difference; 4) head-to-head number of goals scored; 5) goal difference.

23 June 2025; 16:15	Denmark	37–30	Romania	Arena Katowice, Katowice; Attendance: 350; Referees: Mitrović, Vešović (MNE)
23 June 2025; 16:15	F. Pedersen 8	(18–17)	Stanciuc 8	Arena Katowice, Katowice; Attendance: 350; Referees: Mitrović, Vešović (MNE)
23 June 2025; 16:15	1× (yellow card) 1× (suspension)	Report	1× (yellow card) 4× (suspension)	Arena Katowice, Katowice; Attendance: 350; Referees: Mitrović, Vešović (MNE)

23 June 2025; 18:30	Faroe Islands	28–27	France	Arena Katowice, Katowice; Attendance: 510; Referees: Konjičanin, Konjičanin (BIH)
23 June 2025; 18:30	Mittún 9	(16–17)	Tighioart 9	Arena Katowice, Katowice; Attendance: 510; Referees: Konjičanin, Konjičanin (BIH)
23 June 2025; 18:30	2× (suspension)	Report	3× (suspension) 1× (red card)	Arena Katowice, Katowice; Attendance: 510; Referees: Konjičanin, Konjičanin (BIH)

24 June 2025; 16:15	Denmark	41–32	Faroe Islands	Arena Katowice, Katowice; Attendance: 560; Referees: Altmár, Horváth (HUN)
24 June 2025; 16:15	M. Pedersen 9	(20–17)	Gaard Olsen 6	Arena Katowice, Katowice; Attendance: 560; Referees: Altmár, Horváth (HUN)
24 June 2025; 16:15	3× (suspension) 1× (red card)	Report	2× (suspension)	Arena Katowice, Katowice; Attendance: 560; Referees: Altmár, Horváth (HUN)

24 June 2025; 18:30	France	40–33	Romania	Arena Katowice, Katowice; Attendance: 295; Referees: Paolantoni, García (ARG)
24 June 2025; 18:30	Desblancs 8	(19–18)	Stanciuc 6	Arena Katowice, Katowice; Attendance: 295; Referees: Paolantoni, García (ARG)
24 June 2025; 18:30	1× (suspension)	Report	1× (yellow card) 2× (suspension)	Arena Katowice, Katowice; Attendance: 295; Referees: Paolantoni, García (ARG)

=== Group IV ===
Pos	Team	Pld	W	D	L	GF	GA	GD	Pts	Qualification
1	Germany	3	2	1	0	107	93	+14	5	Quarterfinals
2	Egypt	3	2	0	1	83	83	0	4	Quarterfinals
3	Spain	3	1	1	1	109	98	+11	3	9–12th place semifinals
4	Switzerland	3	0	0	3	91	116	−25	0	13–16th place semifinals

Source: IHF
Rules for classification: 1) points; 2) head-to-head points; 3) head-to-head goal difference; 4) head-to-head number of goals scored; 5) goal difference.

23 June 2025; 18:45	Egypt	28–25	Switzerland	Hala Legionów, Kielce; Attendance: 305; Referees: Bozhinovski, Nachevski (MKD)
23 June 2025; 18:45	Mohamed 7	(11–13)	Sirgrist 9	Hala Legionów, Kielce; Attendance: 305; Referees: Bozhinovski, Nachevski (MKD)
23 June 2025; 18:45	3× (suspension)	Report	3× (suspension)	Hala Legionów, Kielce; Attendance: 305; Referees: Bozhinovski, Nachevski (MKD)

23 June 2025; 21:00	Germany	35–35	Spain	Hala Legionów, Kielce; Attendance: 324; Referees: Carmaux, Mursch (FRA)
23 June 2025; 21:00	Móré 8	(19–15)	Torrebejano 9	Hala Legionów, Kielce; Attendance: 324; Referees: Carmaux, Mursch (FRA)
23 June 2025; 21:00	1× (yellow card) 6× (suspension)	Report	1× (yellow card) 4× (suspension)	Hala Legionów, Kielce; Attendance: 324; Referees: Carmaux, Mursch (FRA)

24 June 2025; 18:45	Switzerland	33–45	Spain	Hala Legionów, Kielce; Attendance: 269; Referees: Pagh, Thygesen (DEN)
24 June 2025; 18:45	Sigrist 7	(16–23)	Barrufet 11	Hala Legionów, Kielce; Attendance: 269; Referees: Pagh, Thygesen (DEN)
24 June 2025; 18:45	1× (yellow card) 5× (suspension)	Report	1× (suspension)	Hala Legionów, Kielce; Attendance: 269; Referees: Pagh, Thygesen (DEN)

24 June 2025; 21:00	Germany	29–25	Egypt	Hala Legionów, Kielce; Attendance: 284; Referees: Fremstad, Jørstad (NOR)
24 June 2025; 21:00	Móré 8	(13–9)	El-Battawi 6	Hala Legionów, Kielce; Attendance: 284; Referees: Fremstad, Jørstad (NOR)
24 June 2025; 21:00	2× (suspension)	Report	3× (suspension)	Hala Legionów, Kielce; Attendance: 284; Referees: Fremstad, Jørstad (NOR)

== Placement matches ==
=== 29th place bracket ===
29th–32nd place semifinals
26 June
Uruguay	24
Mexico	22
26 June
Canada	21
Saudi Arabia	44

29th place game
27 June
Uruguay	22
Saudi Arabia	32
31st place game
27 June
Mexico	37
Canada	26

==== 29th–32nd place semifinals ====
26 June 2025; 11:45	Uruguay	24–22	Mexico	Hala Legionów, Kielce; Attendance: 315; Referees: Diop, Faye (SEN)
26 June 2025; 11:45	Restano, Salles 4	(12–10)	Anguiano 7	Hala Legionów, Kielce; Attendance: 315; Referees: Diop, Faye (SEN)
26 June 2025; 11:45	4× (suspension)	Report	1× (yellow card) 4× (suspension)	Hala Legionów, Kielce; Attendance: 315; Referees: Diop, Faye (SEN)

26 June 2025; 14:00	Canada	21–44	Saudi Arabia	Hala Legionów, Kielce; Attendance: 89; Referees: Pukšič, Satler (SLO)
26 June 2025; 14:00	Desbiens 6	(9–22)	Al-Obaidi, Al-Turaiki 7	Hala Legionów, Kielce; Attendance: 89; Referees: Pukšič, Satler (SLO)
26 June 2025; 14:00	2× (suspension) 1× (red card)	Report	1× (suspension) 1× (red card)	Hala Legionów, Kielce; Attendance: 89; Referees: Pukšič, Satler (SLO)

==== 31st place game ====
27 June 2025; 11:45	Mexico	37–26	Canada	Hala Legionów, Kielce; Attendance: 56; Referees: Balvan, Praštalo (BIH)
27 June 2025; 11:45	Anguiano 9	(15–12)	Houle 9	Hala Legionów, Kielce; Attendance: 56; Referees: Balvan, Praštalo (BIH)
27 June 2025; 11:45	4× (suspension)	Report	1× (suspension)	Hala Legionów, Kielce; Attendance: 56; Referees: Balvan, Praštalo (BIH)

==== 29th place game ====
27 June 2025; 14:00	Uruguay	22–32	Saudi Arabia	Hala Legionów, Kielce; Attendance: 57; Referees: Pukšič, Satler (SLO)
27 June 2025; 14:00	Rana 7	(9–15)	three players 6	Hala Legionów, Kielce; Attendance: 57; Referees: Pukšič, Satler (SLO)
27 June 2025; 14:00	1× (yellow card) 4× (suspension) 1× (red card)	Report	7× (suspension)	Hala Legionów, Kielce; Attendance: 57; Referees: Pukšič, Satler (SLO)

=== 25th place bracket ===
25–28th place semifinals
26 June
Brazil	34 (3)
North Macedonia (Pen)	34 (4)
26 June
United States	29
Bahrain	26

25th place game
27 June
North Macedonia	47
United States	28
27th place game
27 June
Brazil	29
Bahrain	28

==== 25–28th place semifinals ====
26 June 2025
16:15
Brazil
34–34
North Macedonia
Hala Legionów, Kielce
Attendance: 82
Referees: Pagh, Thygesen (DEN)
Silva 11
(18–21)
Kalajdjeski 9
1× (yellow card) 3× (suspension) 1× (red card)
Report
1× (yellow card) 2× (suspension)

FT: 34–34 Pen: 3–4

26 June 2025; 18:30	United States	29–26	Bahrain	Hala Legionów, Kielce; Attendance: 147; Referees: Balvan, Praštalo (BIH)
26 June 2025; 18:30	Edwards 7	(16–12)	Al-Showaikh 6	Hala Legionów, Kielce; Attendance: 147; Referees: Balvan, Praštalo (BIH)
26 June 2025; 18:30	3× (suspension) 1× (red card)	Report	1× (yellow card) 1× (suspension) 1× (red card)	Hala Legionów, Kielce; Attendance: 147; Referees: Balvan, Praštalo (BIH)

==== 27th place game ====
27 June 2025; 16:15	Brazil	29–28	Bahrain	Hala Legionów, Kielce; Attendance: 36; Referees: Budzák, Záhradník (SVK)
27 June 2025; 16:15	Bertoldo 10	(14–9)	Kahdem 8	Hala Legionów, Kielce; Attendance: 36; Referees: Budzák, Záhradník (SVK)
27 June 2025; 16:15	6× (suspension)	Report	5× (suspension)	Hala Legionów, Kielce; Attendance: 36; Referees: Budzák, Záhradník (SVK)

==== 25th place game ====
27 June 2025; 18:30	North Macedonia	47–28	United States	Hala Legionów, Kielce; Attendance: 53; Referees: Paolantoni, García (ARG)
27 June 2025; 18:30	Belistojanoski 7	(24–13)	Campos 8	Hala Legionów, Kielce; Attendance: 53; Referees: Paolantoni, García (ARG)
27 June 2025; 18:30	3× (suspension)	Report	3× (suspension)	Hala Legionów, Kielce; Attendance: 53; Referees: Paolantoni, García (ARG)

=== 21st place bracket ===
21st–24th place semifinals
26 June
Argentina	30 (2)
Morocco (Pen)	30 (3)
26 June
South Korea	29
Tunisia	31

21st place game
27 June
Morocco	30
Tunisia	34
23rd place game
27 June
Argentina	35
South Korea	30

==== 21st–24th place semifinals ====
26 June 2025
09:30
Argentina
30–30
Morocco
Arena Sosnowiec - ArcelorMittal Park, Sosnowiec
Attendance: 100
Referees: Sekulić, Jovandić (SRB)
Obregón 10
(14–11)
Razgui 8
3× (suspension)
Report
8× (suspension) 2× (red card)

FT: 30–30 Pen: 2–3

26 June 2025; 11:45	South Korea	29–31	Tunisia	Arena Sosnowiec - ArcelorMittal Park, Sosnowiec; Attendance: 60; Referees: Fotakidis, Kinatzidis (GRE)
26 June 2025; 11:45	Kim J. 7	(19–14)	Ben Fraj 8	Arena Sosnowiec - ArcelorMittal Park, Sosnowiec; Attendance: 60; Referees: Fotakidis, Kinatzidis (GRE)
26 June 2025; 11:45	1× (yellow card) 2× (suspension) 1× (red card)	Report	1× (yellow card) 5× (suspension)	Arena Sosnowiec - ArcelorMittal Park, Sosnowiec; Attendance: 60; Referees: Fotakidis, Kinatzidis (GRE)

==== 23rd place game ====
27 June 2025; 09:30	Argentina	35–30	South Korea	Arena Sosnowiec - ArcelorMittal Park, Sosnowiec; Attendance: 50; Referees: Weijmans, Wolbertus (NED)
27 June 2025; 09:30	Obregón 9	(15–15)	Lee M. 11	Arena Sosnowiec - ArcelorMittal Park, Sosnowiec; Attendance: 50; Referees: Weijmans, Wolbertus (NED)
27 June 2025; 09:30	2× (suspension)	Report	4× (suspension)	Arena Sosnowiec - ArcelorMittal Park, Sosnowiec; Attendance: 50; Referees: Weijmans, Wolbertus (NED)

==== 21st place game ====
27 June 2025; 11:45	Morocco	30–34	Tunisia	Arena Sosnowiec - ArcelorMittal Park, Sosnowiec; Attendance: 30; Referees: Nygaard, Primdahl (DEN)
27 June 2025; 11:45	Razgui 7	(13–18)	Ben Fraj 13	Arena Sosnowiec - ArcelorMittal Park, Sosnowiec; Attendance: 30; Referees: Nygaard, Primdahl (DEN)
27 June 2025; 11:45	2× (yellow card) 7× (suspension) 1× (red card)	Report	5× (suspension)	Arena Sosnowiec - ArcelorMittal Park, Sosnowiec; Attendance: 30; Referees: Nygaard, Primdahl (DEN)

=== 17th place bracket ===
17–20th place semifinals
26 June
Poland	32
Iceland	38
26 June
Algeria	25
Serbia	34

17th place game
27 June
Iceland	35
Serbia	38
19th place game
27 June
Poland	34
Algeria	19

==== 17–20th place semifinals ====
26 June 2025; 14:00	Poland	32–38	Iceland	Arena Sosnowiec - ArcelorMittal Park, Sosnowiec; Attendance: 300; Referees: Furukawa, Murata (JPN)
26 June 2025; 14:00	Mielczarski 7	(18–18)	Erlingsson 11	Arena Sosnowiec - ArcelorMittal Park, Sosnowiec; Attendance: 300; Referees: Furukawa, Murata (JPN)
26 June 2025; 14:00	5× (suspension)	Report	2× (suspension)	Arena Sosnowiec - ArcelorMittal Park, Sosnowiec; Attendance: 300; Referees: Furukawa, Murata (JPN)

26 June 2025; 16:15	Algeria	25–34	Serbia	Arena Sosnowiec - ArcelorMittal Park, Sosnowiec; Attendance: 50; Referees: Nygaard, Primdahl (DEN)
26 June 2025; 16:15	Adel 7	(10–17)	Papović 8	Arena Sosnowiec - ArcelorMittal Park, Sosnowiec; Attendance: 50; Referees: Nygaard, Primdahl (DEN)
26 June 2025; 16:15	4× (suspension)	Report	1× (yellow card) 2× (suspension) 2× (red card)	Arena Sosnowiec - ArcelorMittal Park, Sosnowiec; Attendance: 50; Referees: Nygaard, Primdahl (DEN)

==== 19th place game ====
27 June 2025; 14:00	Poland	34–19	Algeria	Arena Sosnowiec - ArcelorMittal Park, Sosnowiec; Attendance: 200; Referees: Soria, Álvarez (ESP)
27 June 2025; 14:00	Czertowicz 6	(14–8)	Adel 8	Arena Sosnowiec - ArcelorMittal Park, Sosnowiec; Attendance: 200; Referees: Soria, Álvarez (ESP)
27 June 2025; 14:00	2× (suspension)	Report	6× (suspension)	Arena Sosnowiec - ArcelorMittal Park, Sosnowiec; Attendance: 200; Referees: Soria, Álvarez (ESP)

==== 17th place game ====
27 June 2025; 16:15	Iceland	35–38	Serbia	Arena Sosnowiec - ArcelorMittal Park, Sosnowiec; Attendance: 100; Referees: Carmaux, Mursch (FRA)
27 June 2025; 16:15	Sigurjónsson 7	(18–18)	Antonijević, Šijan 10	Arena Sosnowiec - ArcelorMittal Park, Sosnowiec; Attendance: 100; Referees: Carmaux, Mursch (FRA)
27 June 2025; 16:15	1× (yellow card) 4× (suspension)	Report	2× (yellow card) 8× (suspension)	Arena Sosnowiec - ArcelorMittal Park, Sosnowiec; Attendance: 100; Referees: Carmaux, Mursch (FRA)

=== 13–16th place bracket ===
13–16th place semifinals
26 June
Hungary	31
Romania	19
26 June
Japan	28
Switzerland	40

13th place game
27 June
Hungary	32
Switzerland	37
15th place game
27 June
Romania	43
Japan	33

==== 13–16th place semifinals ====
26 June 2025; 14:00	Hungary	31–19	Romania	Arena Katowice, Katowice; Attendance: 215; Referees: Soria, Álvarez (ESP)
26 June 2025; 14:00	Csanálosi 4	(13–10)	Oancea, Stanciuc 4	Arena Katowice, Katowice; Attendance: 215; Referees: Soria, Álvarez (ESP)
26 June 2025; 14:00	2× (suspension) 1× (red card)	Report	5× (suspension)	Arena Katowice, Katowice; Attendance: 215; Referees: Soria, Álvarez (ESP)

26 June 2025; 16:15	Japan	28–40	Switzerland	Arena Katowice, Katowice; Attendance: 170; Referees: Fabryczny, Rawicki (POL)
26 June 2025; 16:15	Hori 6	(8–16)	Steenaerts 9	Arena Katowice, Katowice; Attendance: 170; Referees: Fabryczny, Rawicki (POL)
26 June 2025; 16:15	1× (yellow card) 2× (suspension)	Report	2× (suspension)	Arena Katowice, Katowice; Attendance: 170; Referees: Fabryczny, Rawicki (POL)

==== 15th place game ====
27 June 2025; 14:00	Romania	43–33	Japan	Arena Katowice, Katowice; Attendance: 150; Referees: Thiyagarajah, Thiyagarajah (GER)
27 June 2025; 14:00	Radu 11	(18–15)	Hori 5	Arena Katowice, Katowice; Attendance: 150; Referees: Thiyagarajah, Thiyagarajah (GER)
27 June 2025; 14:00	5× (suspension)	Report	1× (yellow card) 1× (suspension)	Arena Katowice, Katowice; Attendance: 150; Referees: Thiyagarajah, Thiyagarajah (GER)

==== 13th place game ====
27 June 2025; 16:15	Hungary	32–37	Switzerland	Arena Katowice, Katowice; Attendance: 190; Referees: Mitrović, Vešović (MNE)
27 June 2025; 16:15	Gazsó 8	(17–17)	Sigrist 12	Arena Katowice, Katowice; Attendance: 190; Referees: Mitrović, Vešović (MNE)
27 June 2025; 16:15	4× (suspension)	Report	5× (suspension)	Arena Katowice, Katowice; Attendance: 190; Referees: Mitrović, Vešović (MNE)

=== 9–12th place bracket ===
9–12th place semifinals
26 June
Austria	24
France	27
26 June
Croatia	31
Spain	34

Ninth place game
27 June
France	40
Spain	41
Eleventh place game
27 June
Austria	30
Croatia	26

==== 9–12th place semifinals ====
26 June 2025; 09:30	Austria	24–27	France	Arena Katowice, Katowice; Attendance: 230; Referees: Mitrović, Vešović (MNE)
26 June 2025; 09:30	Böhm 7	(9–15)	Tighioart 10	Arena Katowice, Katowice; Attendance: 230; Referees: Mitrović, Vešović (MNE)
26 June 2025; 09:30	4× (suspension)	Report	2× (yellow card) 1× (suspension)	Arena Katowice, Katowice; Attendance: 230; Referees: Mitrović, Vešović (MNE)

26 June 2025; 11:45	Croatia	31–34	Spain	Arena Katowice, Katowice; Attendance: 240; Referees: Weijmans, Wolbertus (NED)
26 June 2025; 11:45	Juranić 9	(14–14)	González Unciti 7	Arena Katowice, Katowice; Attendance: 240; Referees: Weijmans, Wolbertus (NED)
26 June 2025; 11:45	1× (yellow card) 5× (suspension)	Report		Arena Katowice, Katowice; Attendance: 240; Referees: Weijmans, Wolbertus (NED)

==== 11th place game ====
27 June 2025; 09:30	Austria	30–26	Croatia	Arena Katowice, Katowice; Attendance: 100; Referees: Fotakidis, Kinatzidis (GRE)
27 June 2025; 09:30	Budde 8	(12–7)	Ivanković 7	Arena Katowice, Katowice; Attendance: 100; Referees: Fotakidis, Kinatzidis (GRE)
27 June 2025; 09:30	4× (suspension)	Report	6× (suspension)	Arena Katowice, Katowice; Attendance: 100; Referees: Fotakidis, Kinatzidis (GRE)

==== Ninth place game ====
27 June 2025; 11:45	France	40–41	Spain	Arena Katowice, Katowice; Attendance: 250; Referees: Fremstad, Jørstad (NOR)
27 June 2025; 11:45	Desblancs, Tighioart 9	(16–25)	González Unciti 8	Arena Katowice, Katowice; Attendance: 250; Referees: Fremstad, Jørstad (NOR)
27 June 2025; 11:45	1× (yellow card) 2× (suspension)	Report	1× (yellow card) 4× (suspension)	Arena Katowice, Katowice; Attendance: 250; Referees: Fremstad, Jørstad (NOR)

== Knockout stage ==
=== Bracket ===
Championship bracket

Quarter-finals
26 June
Slovenia	33
Faroe Islands	35
26 June
Portugal	30
Egypt	26
26 June
Denmark	25
Norway	23
26 June
Germany	26
Sweden	32

Semi-finals
27 June
Faroe Islands	37
Portugal (ET)	38
27 June
Denmark (ET)	40
Sweden	37

Final
29 June
Portugal	26
Denmark	29
Third place
29 June
Faroe Islands	27
Sweden	26

5–8th place bracket

5-8th semifinals
27 June
Slovenia	30
Egypt	33
27 June
Norway	29
Germany	33

Fifth place game
29 June
Egypt	26
Germany	27
Seventh place game
29 June
Slovenia	24
Norway	23

==== Quarterfinals ====
26 June 2025; 18:30	Denmark	25–23	Norway	Arena Katowice, Katowice; Attendance: 485; Referees: Konjičanin, Konjičanin (BIH)
26 June 2025; 18:30	three players 5	(11–11)	Gram, Wallevik 4	Arena Katowice, Katowice; Attendance: 485; Referees: Konjičanin, Konjičanin (BIH)
26 June 2025; 18:30	1× (yellow card) 4× (suspension)	Report	1× (yellow card) 3× (suspension)	Arena Katowice, Katowice; Attendance: 485; Referees: Konjičanin, Konjičanin (BIH)

26 June 2025; 18:30	Portugal	30–26	Egypt	Arena Sosnowiec - ArcelorMittal Park, Sosnowiec; Attendance: 150; Referees: Fremstad, Jørstad (NOR)
26 June 2025; 18:30	Teixeira 7	(13–13)	El-Battawi, Emad 6	Arena Sosnowiec - ArcelorMittal Park, Sosnowiec; Attendance: 150; Referees: Fremstad, Jørstad (NOR)
26 June 2025; 18:30	1× (yellow card) 3× (suspension)	Report	4× (suspension)	Arena Sosnowiec - ArcelorMittal Park, Sosnowiec; Attendance: 150; Referees: Fremstad, Jørstad (NOR)

26 June 2025; 21:00	Slovenia	33−35	Faroe Islands	Arena Sosnowiec - ArcelorMittal Park, Sosnowiec; Attendance: 200; Referees: Thiyagarajah, Thiyagarajah (GER)
26 June 2025; 21:00	Anžič 14	(13−19)	Vedelsbøl 10	Arena Sosnowiec - ArcelorMittal Park, Sosnowiec; Attendance: 200; Referees: Thiyagarajah, Thiyagarajah (GER)
26 June 2025; 21:00	6× (suspension) 1× (red card)	Report	6× (suspension)	Arena Sosnowiec - ArcelorMittal Park, Sosnowiec; Attendance: 200; Referees: Thiyagarajah, Thiyagarajah (GER)

26 June 2025; 21:00	Germany	26−32	Sweden	Arena Katowice, Katowice; Attendance: 525; Referees: Sosa, Lemes (URU)
26 June 2025; 21:00	Móré 7	(14−16)	Månsson 9	Arena Katowice, Katowice; Attendance: 525; Referees: Sosa, Lemes (URU)
26 June 2025; 21:00	1× (yellow card) 6× (suspension)	Report	1× (yellow card) 8× (suspension) 2× (red card)	Arena Katowice, Katowice; Attendance: 525; Referees: Sosa, Lemes (URU)

==== 5-8th place semifinals ====
27 June 2025; 18:30	Slovenia	30–33	Egypt	Arena Sosnowiec - ArcelorMittal Park, Sosnowiec; Attendance: 100; Referees: Sosa, Lemes (URU)
27 June 2025; 18:30	Anžič 9	(17–14)	Abdelhady, Abdelrahim 7	Arena Sosnowiec - ArcelorMittal Park, Sosnowiec; Attendance: 100; Referees: Sosa, Lemes (URU)
27 June 2025; 18:30	5× (suspension) 1× (red card)	Report	3× (suspension) 1× (red card)	Arena Sosnowiec - ArcelorMittal Park, Sosnowiec; Attendance: 100; Referees: Sosa, Lemes (URU)

27 June 2025; 18:30	Norway	29–33	Germany	Arena Katowice, Katowice; Attendance: 385; Referees: Bozhinovski, Nachevski (MKD)
27 June 2025; 18:30	Haugstvedt 6	(13–13)	Newel 7	Arena Katowice, Katowice; Attendance: 385; Referees: Bozhinovski, Nachevski (MKD)
27 June 2025; 18:30	1× (yellow card) 4× (suspension) 2× (red card)	Report	1× (yellow card) 2× (suspension)	Arena Katowice, Katowice; Attendance: 385; Referees: Bozhinovski, Nachevski (MKD)

==== Semifinals ====
27 June 2025
21:00
Faroe Islands
37–38 (ET)
Portugal
Arena Sosnowiec - ArcelorMittal Park, Sosnowiec
Attendance: 300
Referees: Sekulić, Jovandić (SRB)
Mittún 11
(12–15)
Monteiro 8
2× (yellow card) 4× (suspension)
Report
1× (yellow card) 7× (suspension) 1× (red card)

FT: 29–29 ET: 5–5, 3–4

27 June 2025
21:00
Denmark
40–37 (ET)
Sweden
Arena Katowice, Katowice
Attendance: 485
Referees: Altmár, Horváth (HUN)
Jensen 7
(18–19)
Månsson 11
2× (suspension)
Report
4× (suspension)

FT: 36–36 ET: 4–1

==== Seventh place game ====
29 June 2025; 12:00	Slovenia	24–23	Norway	Arena Katowice, Katowice; Attendance: 804; Referees: Budzák, Záhradník (SVK)
29 June 2025; 12:00	Dragić 9	(10–13)	Haugli, Haugstvedt 5	Arena Katowice, Katowice; Attendance: 804; Referees: Budzák, Záhradník (SVK)
29 June 2025; 12:00	1× (yellow card) 4× (suspension)	Report	1× (suspension)	Arena Katowice, Katowice; Attendance: 804; Referees: Budzák, Záhradník (SVK)

==== Fifth place game ====
29 June 2025; 14:30	Egypt	26–27	Germany	Arena Katowice, Katowice; Attendance: 927; Referees: Altmár, Horváth (HUN)
29 June 2025; 14:30	Azab 6	(15–11)	Kutz 8	Arena Katowice, Katowice; Attendance: 927; Referees: Altmár, Horváth (HUN)
29 June 2025; 14:30	2× (suspension)	Report	1× (yellow card) 4× (suspension)	Arena Katowice, Katowice; Attendance: 927; Referees: Altmár, Horváth (HUN)

==== Third place game ====
29 June 2025; 17:00	Faroe Islands	27–26	Sweden	Arena Katowice, Katowice; Attendance: 1,480; Referees: Fabryczny, Rawicki (POL)
29 June 2025; 17:00	Mittún 9	(12–12)	Månsson 10	Arena Katowice, Katowice; Attendance: 1,480; Referees: Fabryczny, Rawicki (POL)
29 June 2025; 17:00	1× (suspension) 1× (red card)	Report	1× (yellow card) 4× (suspension)	Arena Katowice, Katowice; Attendance: 1,480; Referees: Fabryczny, Rawicki (POL)

==== Final ====
29 June 2025; 19:30	Portugal	26–29	Denmark	Arena Katowice, Katowice; Attendance: 2,455; Referees: Konjičanin, Konjičanin (BIH)
29 June 2025; 19:30	Brandão 6	(10–14)	F. Pedersen 9	Arena Katowice, Katowice; Attendance: 2,455; Referees: Konjičanin, Konjičanin (BIH)
29 June 2025; 19:30	1× (yellow card) 5× (suspension) 1× (red card)	Report	1× (yellow card) 3× (suspension)	Arena Katowice, Katowice; Attendance: 2,455; Referees: Konjičanin, Konjičanin (BIH)

== Final ranking ==
Rank	Team
1st place, gold medalist(s)	Denmark
2nd place, silver medalist(s)	Portugal
3rd place, bronze medalist(s)	Faroe Islands
4	Sweden
5	Germany
6	Egypt
7	Slovenia
8	Norway
9	Spain
10	France
11	Austria
12	Croatia
13	Switzerland
14	Hungary
15	Romania
16	Japan
17	Serbia
18	Iceland
19	Poland
20	Algeria
21	Tunisia
22	Morocco
23	Argentina
24	South Korea
25	North Macedonia
26	United States
27	Brazil
28	Bahrain
29	Saudi Arabia
30	Uruguay
31	Mexico
32	Canada

== Statistics and awards ==
=== Top goalscorers ===
Rank	Name	Goals	Shots	%
1	(Faroe Islands) Óli Mittún	73	105	70
2	(Sweden) Axel Månsson	70	112	63
3	(Slovenia) Aljuš Anžič	61	83	73
4	(Switzerland) Luca Sigrist	60	99	61
5	(Iceland) Elmar Erlingsson	57	81	70
6	(Tunisia) Kousay Ben Fraj	54	76	71
6	(France) Naël Tighioart	54	64	84
8	(Romania) Daniel Stanciuc	53	91	58
9	(Japan) Haruto Nagamori	51	75	68
10	(Denmark) Magnus Pedersen	49	63	78
10	(North Macedonia) Dimitar Uzunchev	49	71	69

Source: IHF

=== Top goalkeepers ===
Rank	Name	%	Saves	Shots
1	(Austria) Leon Theodor Bergmann	39	91	236
2	(Norway) Henrik Ibsen	36	79	221
3	(Slovenia) Mark Šalamon	35	77	233
4	(Serbia) Marko Draško	33	71	264
4	(Sweden) Arvid Skoog	33	70	199
4	(North Macedonia) Ivan Galevski	33	69	234
4	(Croatia) Tin Herceg	33	66	234
4	(Portugal) Gonçalo Morgado	33	65	219
4	(Algeria) Salim Mezaza	33	64	235
4	(South Korea) Kim Hyeon-min	33	63	232

Source: IHF

=== Awards ===
The All-star Team was announced on 29 June 2025.

Position	Player
Goalkeeper	(Portugal) Diogo Rêma Marques
Right wing	(Denmark) Magnus Pedersen
Right back	(Denmark) Nikolaj Larsson
Centre back	(Sweden) Axel Månsson
Left back	(Portugal) João Lourenço
Left wing	(Sweden) Noah Martinsson
Pivot	(Egypt) Moaz Azab
MVP	(Faroe Islands) Óli Mittún
