= 2018 African Men's Junior Handball Championship =

Tournament details
- Host country: Morocco
- Venue(s): 1 (in 1 host city)
- Dates: 7–14 September
- Teams: 7 (from 1 confederation)

Final positions
- Champions: Egypt (12th title)
- Runner-up: Tunisia
- Third place: Nigeria
- Fourth place: Morocco

Tournament statistics
- Matches played: 21
- Goals scored: 1,119 (53.29 per match)

The 2018 African Men's Junior Handball Championship was held in Marrakesh, Morocco from 7 to 14 September 2018 at the Prince Moulay Rachid Hall. The top three teams qualified for the 2019 Men's Junior World Handball Championship.

== Results ==
All times are local (UTC+1).

Pos	Team	Pld	W	D	L	GF	GA	GD	Pts	Qualification
1st place, gold medalist(s)	Egypt	6	6	0	0	203	125	+78	12	2019 Junior World Championship
2nd place, silver medalist(s)	Tunisia	6	5	0	1	209	142	+67	10	2019 Junior World Championship
3rd place, bronze medalist(s)	Nigeria	6	4	0	2	179	172	+7	8	2019 Junior World Championship
4	Morocco (H)	6	1	2	3	130	147	−17	4 (Note: Morocco 22–22 Algeria)	
5	Algeria	6	1	2	3	138	170	−32	4	
6	Angola	6	1	1	4	122	150	−28	3	
7	Guinea	6	0	1	5	138	213	−75	1	

Rules for classification: 1) Points; 2) Head-to-head points; 3) Head-to-head goal difference; 4) Head-to-head goals scored; 5) Goal difference; 6) Goals scored; 7) Draw.
(H) Hosts
Notes:

7 September 2018; 15:00	Tunisia	46–25	Algeria	Prince Moulay Rachid Hall, Marrakesh
7 September 2018; 15:00		(23–12)		Prince Moulay Rachid Hall, Marrakesh

7 September 2018; 17:00	Egypt	39–27	Nigeria	Prince Moulay Rachid Hall, Marrakesh
7 September 2018; 17:00		(21–13)		Prince Moulay Rachid Hall, Marrakesh

7 September 2018; 20:30	Morocco	24–21	Guinea	Prince Moulay Rachid Hall, Marrakesh
7 September 2018; 20:30		(11–8)		Prince Moulay Rachid Hall, Marrakesh

8 September 2018; 15:00	Algeria	20–18	Angola	Prince Moulay Rachid Hall, Marrakesh
8 September 2018; 15:00		(11–8)		Prince Moulay Rachid Hall, Marrakesh

8 September 2018; 17:00	Guinea	21–47	Egypt	Prince Moulay Rachid Hall, Marrakesh
8 September 2018; 17:00		(10–18)		Prince Moulay Rachid Hall, Marrakesh

8 September 2018; 19:00	Morocco	22–29	Nigeria	Prince Moulay Rachid Hall, Marrakesh
8 September 2018; 19:00		(8–18)		Prince Moulay Rachid Hall, Marrakesh

9 September 2018; 15:00	Angola	23–18	Guinea	Prince Moulay Rachid Hall, Marrakesh
9 September 2018; 15:00		(13–10)		Prince Moulay Rachid Hall, Marrakesh

9 September 2018; 17:00	Nigeria	25–38	Tunisia	Prince Moulay Rachid Hall, Marrakesh
9 September 2018; 17:00		(10–21)		Prince Moulay Rachid Hall, Marrakesh

9 September 2018; 19:00	Morocco	22–22	Algeria	Prince Moulay Rachid Hall, Marrakesh
9 September 2018; 19:00		(11–12)		Prince Moulay Rachid Hall, Marrakesh

10 September 2018; 15:00	Tunisia	48–22	Guinea	Prince Moulay Rachid Hall, Marrakesh
10 September 2018; 15:00		(27–8)		Prince Moulay Rachid Hall, Marrakesh

10 September 2018; 17:00	Algeria	22–25	Nigeria	Prince Moulay Rachid Hall, Marrakesh
10 September 2018; 17:00		(14–12)		Prince Moulay Rachid Hall, Marrakesh

10 September 2018; 19:00	Egypt	29–17	Angola	Prince Moulay Rachid Hall, Marrakesh
10 September 2018; 19:00		(15–14)		Prince Moulay Rachid Hall, Marrakesh

12 September 2018; 15:00	Guinea	25–40	Nigeria	Prince Moulay Rachid Hall, Marrakesh
12 September 2018; 15:00		(10–20)		Prince Moulay Rachid Hall, Marrakesh

12 September 2018; 17:00	Tunisia	30–18	Angola	Prince Moulay Rachid Hall, Marrakesh
12 September 2018; 17:00		(13–10)		Prince Moulay Rachid Hall, Marrakesh

12 September 2018; 19:00	Egypt	30–20	Morocco	Prince Moulay Rachid Hall, Marrakesh
12 September 2018; 19:00		(15–8)		Prince Moulay Rachid Hall, Marrakesh

13 September 2018; 15:00	Angola	26–33	Nigeria	Prince Moulay Rachid Hall, Marrakesh
13 September 2018; 15:00		(13–15)		Prince Moulay Rachid Hall, Marrakesh

13 September 2018; 17:00	Algeria	18–28	Egypt	Prince Moulay Rachid Hall, Marrakesh
13 September 2018; 17:00		(11–12)		Prince Moulay Rachid Hall, Marrakesh

13 September 2018; 19:00	Morocco	22–25	Tunisia	Prince Moulay Rachid Hall, Marrakesh
13 September 2018; 19:00		(9–17)		Prince Moulay Rachid Hall, Marrakesh

14 September 2018; 15:00	Guinea	31–31	Algeria	Prince Moulay Rachid Hall, Marrakesh
14 September 2018; 15:00		(17–13)		Prince Moulay Rachid Hall, Marrakesh

14 September 2018; 17:00	Morocco	20–20	Angola	Prince Moulay Rachid Hall, Marrakesh
14 September 2018; 17:00		(8–8)		Prince Moulay Rachid Hall, Marrakesh

14 September 2018; 19:00	Tunisia	22–30	Egypt	Prince Moulay Rachid Hall, Marrakesh
14 September 2018; 19:00		(12–15)		Prince Moulay Rachid Hall, Marrakesh
