= African Men's Junior Handball Championship =

Handball competition in Africa

- Current season, competition or edition: 2026 African Men's Junior Handball Championship
- Sport: Handball
- First season: 1980
- Continent: Africa (CAHB)
- Most recent champion: Egypt (2026)
- Most titles: Egypt (15 titles)

The African Handball Junior Nations Championship is the official competition for junior men's national handball teams of Africa, and takes place every two years. In addition to crowning the African champions, the tournament also serves as a qualifying tournament for the World Junior Handball Championship.

== Medal summary ==
#	Year	Host	Final			Third place match (or third place)		
#	Year	Host	Champion	Score	Runner-up	Third place	Score	Fourth place
I	1980; Details	(Nigeria); Lagos	Nigeria	13 – 11	Tunisia	Algeria	18 – 14	Egypt
II	1982; Details	(Benin); Cotonou	Egypt	12 – 11	Algeria	Nigeria		
III	1984; Details	(Nigeria); Bauchi	Egypt	18 – 15	Nigeria	Algeria		
iV	1986; Details	(Algeria); Algiers	Algeria	17 – 15	Egypt	Tunisia	23 – 22	Nigeria
V	1988; Details	(Tunisia); Tunis	Algeria	No playoffs	Egypt	Tunisia	No playoffs	Nigeria
VI	1990; Details	(Egypt); Cairo	Egypt	No playoffs	Algeria	Tunisia	No playoffs	Morocco
VII	1992; Details	(Tunisia); Tunis	Egypt	No playoffs	Algeria	Tunisia	No playoffs	no 4th, only 3 teams
VIII	1994; Details	(Egypt); Cairo	Cancelled due to insufficient number of participants			Cancelled due to insufficient number of participants		
IX	1996; Details	(Egypt); Cairo	Egypt	No playoffs	Algeria	Tunisia	No playoffs	Guinea
X	1998; Details	(Ivory Coast); Abidjan	Egypt	32 – 25	Tunisia	Angola		Ivory Coast
XI	2000; Details	(Tunisia); Tunis	Egypt		Tunisia	Algeria		South Africa
XII	2002; Details	(Benin); Cotonou	Tunisia	22 – 21	Egypt	Algeria	round robin	Congo
XIII	2004; Details	(Ivory Coast); Abidjan	Egypt	28 – 19	Tunisia	Congo		Ivory Coast
XIV	2006; Details	(Ivory Coast); Abidjan	Egypt	26 – 25	Tunisia	Angola	36 – 32	Algeria
XV	2008; Details	(Libya); Tripoli	Tunisia	26 – 19	Libya	Morocco	34 – 28	Algeria
XVII	2010; Details	(Gabon); Libreville	Egypt	38 – 31	Tunisia	Algeria	32 – 24	Benin
XIX	2012; Details	(Ivory Coast); Abidjan	Tunisia	41 – 25	Congo	Egypt	27 – 22	Angola
XXI	2014; Details	(Kenya); Nairobi	Egypt	25 – 23	Tunisia	Angola	29 – 25	Algeria
XXIII	2016; Details	(Mali); Bamako	Tunisia	No playoffs	Egypt	Algeria	No playoffs	Burkina Faso
XXV	2018; Details	(Morocco); Marrakesh	Egypt	No playoffs	Tunisia	Nigeria	No playoffs	Morocco
XXVII	2020	(Morocco); Casablanca	Cancelled due to the COVID-19 pandemic					
XXIX	2022; Details	(Rwanda); Kigali	Egypt	35 – 15	Algeria	Tunisia	24 – 22	Angola
XXXI	2024; Details	(Tunisia); Mahdia	Egypt	29 – 25	Tunisia	Algeria	23 – 20	Morocco
XXXIII	2026; Details	(Ivory Coast); Abidjan	Egypt	31 – 29	Tunisia	Nigeria	24 – 19	Angola

== Medal count ==
Rank	Nation	Gold	Silver	Bronze	Total
1	Egypt	15	4	1	20
2	Tunisia	4	10	6	20
3	Algeria	2	5	7	14
4	Nigeria	1	1	3	5
5	Congo	0	1	1	2
6	Libya	0	1	0	1
7	Angola	0	0	3	3
8	Morocco	0	0	1	1
Totals (8 entries)		22	22	22	66

== Participation details ==
Nation	(Nigeria) 1980	(Benin) 1982	(Nigeria) 1984	(Algeria) 1986	(Tunisia) 1988	(Egypt) 1990	(Tunisia) 1992	(Egypt) 1996	(Ivory Coast) 1998	(Tunisia) 2000	(Benin) 2002	(Ivory Coast) 2004	(Ivory Coast) 2006	(Libya) 2008	(Gabon) 2010	(Ivory Coast) 2012	(Kenya) 2014	(Mali) 2016	(Morocco) 2018	(Rwanda) 2022	(Tunisia) 2024	(Ivory Coast) 2026	Years
Algeria	3rd	2nd	3rd	1st	1st	2nd	2nd	2nd		3rd	3rd		4th	4th	3rd	5th	4th	3rd	5th	2nd	3rd	10th	20
Angola			7th	6th	5th	5th			3rd		5th	5th	3rd	6th	5th	4th	3rd		6th	4th		4th	
Benin		4+	5th								6th				4th							15th	
Burkina Faso															7th		9th	4th					
Cameroon														5th	9th							9th	
Central African Rep.															DQ								
Congo				5th							4th	3rd			5th	2nd				7th		13th	
DR Congo													9th	8th	8th		7th					7th	
Egypt	4th	1st	1st	2nd	2nd	1st	1st	1st	1st	1st	2nd	1st	1st		1st	3rd	1st	2nd	1st	1st	1st	1st	21
Gabon			8th												6th	6th	6th						
Ghana													8th										
Guinea								4th								11th	DQ		7th		5th	5th	
Ivory Coast	5+	4+	4th						4th			4th	7th	7th		10th						12th	
Kenya																	8th					11th	
Libya													6th	2nd		7th	5th			6th	7th		
Madagascar																						14th	
Mali															11th	8th		6th			8th		
Mauritius												6th											
Morocco			9th	7th	6th	4th			5th				5th	3rd	10th	9th		5th	4th	5th	4th		
Nigeria	1st	3rd	2nd		4th														3rd			3rd	
Rwanda												•								8th	6th	8th	
Senegal		4+																					
South Africa										4th													
Togo			6th																				
Tunisia	2nd			3rd	3rd	3rd	3rd	3rd	2nd	2nd	1st	2nd	2nd	1st	2nd	1st	2nd	1st	2nd	3rd	2nd	2nd	20
Zimbabwe																						16th	
Total				7	6	5	3	4			6	6	9	8	12	11	10	6	7	8	8	16	

== See also ==
- African Men's Handball Championship
- African Men's Youth Handball Championship
