= 2014 African Men's Junior Handball Championship =

Tournament details
- Host country: Kenya
- Venue(s): 1 (in 1 host city)
- Dates: March 23–29, 2014
- Teams: 11 (from 1 confederation)

Final positions
- Champions: Egypt (11th title)
- Runner-up: Tunisia
- Third place: Angola
- Fourth place: Algeria

Tournament statistics
- Matches played: 19
- Goals scored: 939 (49.42 per match)

The 2014 African Men's Junior Handball Championship was the 20th edition of the tournament, organized by the African Handball Confederation, under the auspices of the International Handball Federation and held in Nairobi, Kenya from March 23 to 29, 2014.

Egypt was the champion and qualified, alongside the two remaining top teams. to the 2015 world championship.

== Draw ==
Group A	Group B	Group C
Angola; Algeria; DR Congo	Tunisia; Libya; Guinea	Egypt; Gabon; Kenya; Burundi

== Preliminary round ==
Nine teams were drawn into three groups of three, with the top team of each group plus the second best of all the groups qualifying for the semifinal, the remaining two second-placed teams playing for the 5-6 classification whereas the third-placed teams of each group played for the 7-9 classification matches.

All times are local (UTC+3).

=== Group A ===
Qualified to the Semi-finals
Relegated to the 7-9 classification

Team	Pld	W	D	L	GF	GA	GD	Pts
Angola	2	2	0	0	59	53	+6	4
Algeria	2	1	0	1	63	55	+8	2
DR Congo	2	0	0	2	44	58	−14	0

23 March 2014; 10:00	Angola	25 – 23	DR Congo	Safaricom Indoor Arena, Kasarani
23 March 2014; 10:00		(12–09)		Safaricom Indoor Arena, Kasarani

24 March 2014; 10:00	Algeria	33 – 21	DR Congo	Safaricom Indoor Arena, Kasarani
24 March 2014; 10:00		(18–11)		Safaricom Indoor Arena, Kasarani

25 March 2014; 14:00	Angola	34 – 30	Algeria	Safaricom Indoor Arena, Kasarani
25 March 2014; 14:00		(15–15)		Safaricom Indoor Arena, Kasarani

=== Group B ===
Qualified to the Semi-finals
Relegated to the 5-6 classification
Disclassified due to non-payment of participation fee

Team	Pld	W	D	L	GF	GA	GD	Pts
Tunisia	1	1	0	0	29	19	+10	2
Libya	1	0	0	1	19	29	−10	0
Guinea	0	0	0	0	0	0	0	0

23 March 2014; 12:00	Tunisia	30 – 26	Guinea	Safaricom Indoor Arena, Kasarani
23 March 2014; 12:00		(14–15)		Safaricom Indoor Arena, Kasarani

24 March 2014; 14:00	Libya	–	Guinea	Safaricom Indoor Arena, Kasarani
24 March 2014; 14:00		(–)		Safaricom Indoor Arena, Kasarani

25 March 2014; 10:00	Tunisia	29 – 19	Libya	Safaricom Indoor Arena, Kasarani
25 March 2014; 10:00		(12–09)		Safaricom Indoor Arena, Kasarani

=== Group C ===
Qualified to the Semi-finals
Relegated to the 5-6 classification
Relegated to the 7-9 classification

Team	Pld	W	D	L	GF	GA	GD	Pts
Egypt	3	3	0	0	138	56	+82	6
Gabon	3	2	0	1	80	58	+22	4
Kenya	3	1	0	2	59	90	−31	2
Burundi	3	0	0	3	49	122	−73	0

23 March 2014; 14:00	Egypt	62 – 18	Burundi	Safaricom Indoor Arena, Kasarani
23 March 2014; 14:00		(30–05)		Safaricom Indoor Arena, Kasarani

17:00	Gabon	27 – 14	Kenya	Safaricom Indoor Arena, Kasarani
17:00		(14–08)		Safaricom Indoor Arena, Kasarani

24 March 2014; 16:00	Burundi	12 – 34	Gabon	Safaricom Indoor Arena, Kasarani
24 March 2014; 16:00		(05–22)		Safaricom Indoor Arena, Kasarani

18:00	Egypt	44 – 19	Kenya	Safaricom Indoor Arena, Kasarani
18:00		(22–04)		Safaricom Indoor Arena, Kasarani

25 March 2014; 16:00	Gabon	19 – 32	Egypt	Safaricom Indoor Arena, Kasarani
25 March 2014; 16:00		(09–14)		Safaricom Indoor Arena, Kasarani

18:00	Burundi	19 – 26	Kenya	Safaricom Indoor Arena, Kasarani
18:00		(07–15)		Safaricom Indoor Arena, Kasarani

== Placement round 7–9 ==
26 March 2014; 10:00	DR Congo	29 – 21	Kenya	Safaricom Indoor Arena, Kasarani
26 March 2014; 10:00		(15–10)		Safaricom Indoor Arena, Kasarani

27 March 2014; 10:00	DR Congo	40 – 20	Burundi	Safaricom Indoor Arena, Kasarani
27 March 2014; 10:00		(18–12)		Safaricom Indoor Arena, Kasarani

== Placement round 5–6 ==
28 March 2014; 16:00	Libya	24 – 17	Gabon	Safaricom Indoor Arena, Kasarani
28 March 2014; 16:00		(12–08)		Safaricom Indoor Arena, Kasarani

== Final round ==
=== Bracket ===
Semifinals
27 Mar 2014 – 16:00
Egypt	27
Angola	19
27 Mar 2014 – 18:00
Tunisia	26
Algeria	18

Final
29 Mar 2014 – 14:00
Egypt	25
Tunisia	23
Bronze medal match
28 Mar 2014 – 18:00
Algeria	25
Angola	29

=== Semi finals ===
27 March 2014; 16:00	Egypt	27 – 19	Angola	Safaricom Indoor Arena, Kasarani
27 March 2014; 16:00		(13–07)		Safaricom Indoor Arena, Kasarani

18:00	Tunisia	26 – 18	Algeria	Safaricom Indoor Arena, Kasarani
18:00		(12–08)		Safaricom Indoor Arena, Kasarani

=== Bronze medal game ===
28 March 2014; 18:00	Algeria	25 – 29	Angola	Safaricom Indoor Arena, Kasarani
28 March 2014; 18:00		(16–16)		Safaricom Indoor Arena, Kasarani

=== Final ===
29 March 2014; 14:00	Egypt	25 – 23	Tunisia	Safaricom Indoor Arena, Kasarani
29 March 2014; 14:00		(12–11)		Safaricom Indoor Arena, Kasarani

== Final standings ==
Qualified for the 2015 World Championship

Rank	Team	Record
Gold medal	Egypt	5–0
Silver medal	Tunisia	2–1
Bronze medal	Angola	3–1
4	Algeria	2–2
5	Libya	1–1
6	Gabon	2–2
7	DR Congo	2–2
8	Kenya	1–3
9	Burundi	0–4

== Awards ==
2014 African Men's Junior Handball Championship winner

Egypt
11th title

== See also ==
- 2014 African Men's Handball Championship
- 2014 African Men's Youth Handball Championship
