= 2022 African Men's Junior Handball Championship =

International handball competition

Tournament details
- Host country: Rwanda
- Venue: 1 (in 1 host city)
- Dates: 20–27 August
- Teams: 8 (from 1 confederation)

Final positions
- Champions: Egypt (13th title)
- Runners-up: Algeria
- Third place: Tunisia
- Fourth place: Angola

Tournament statistics
- Matches played: 18
- Goals scored: 1,050 (58.33 per match)

The 2022 African Men's Junior Handball Championship was held in Kigali, Rwanda from 20 to 27 August 2022. It also acted as a qualification tournament for the 2023 Men's Junior World Handball Championship.

Egypt won its 13th title after beating Algeria 35–15, while Tunisia captured the bronze medal with a 24–22 win over Angola.

== Draw ==
The draw was held on 22 July 2022 at the head office of the African Handball Confederation in Abidjan, Ivory Coast.

== Preliminary round ==
All times are local (UTC+2).

=== Group A ===
Pos	Team	Pld	W	D	L	GF	GA	GD	Pts	Qualification
1	Tunisia	3	3	0	0	99	66	+33	6	Semifinals
2	Angola	3	2	0	1	97	71	+26	4	Semifinals
3	Morocco	3	1	0	2	83	85	−2	2	Fifth place game
4	Rwanda (H)	3	0	0	3	68	125	−57	0	Seventh place game

Updated to match(es) played on 24 August 2022. Source:
Rules for classification: 1) Points; 2) Head-to-head points; 3) Head-to-head goal difference; 4) Head-to-head goals scored; 5) Goal difference; 6) Goals scored; 7) Draw.
(H) Hosts

20 August 2022; 18:00	Rwanda	20–43	Angola	BK Arena, Kigali
20 August 2022; 18:00		(8–19)		BK Arena, Kigali

22 August 2022; 13:00	Tunisia	25–22	Angola	BK Arena, Kigali
22 August 2022; 13:00		(12–9)		BK Arena, Kigali

22 August 2022; 19:00	Morocco	39–22	Rwanda	BK Arena, Kigali
22 August 2022; 19:00		(21–8)		BK Arena, Kigali

24 August 2022; 17:00	Morocco	26–32	Angola	BK Arena, Kigali
24 August 2022; 17:00		(12–15)		BK Arena, Kigali

24 August 2022; 19:00	Tunisia	43–26	Rwanda	BK Arena, Kigali
24 August 2022; 19:00		(21–14)		BK Arena, Kigali

25 August 2022; 19:00	Tunisia	31–18	Morocco	BK Arena, Kigali
25 August 2022; 19:00		(18–7)		BK Arena, Kigali

=== Group B ===
Pos	Team	Pld	W	D	L	GF	GA	GD	Pts	Qualification
1	Egypt	3	3	0	0	119	73	+46	6	Semifinals
2	Algeria	3	2	0	1	96	92	+4	4	Semifinals
3	Libya	3	1	0	2	69	99	−30	2	Fifth place game
4	Congo	3	0	0	3	74	94	−20	0	Seventh place game

Updated to match(es) played on 24 August 2022. Source:
Rules for classification: 1) Points; 2) Head-to-head points; 3) Head-to-head goal difference; 4) Head-to-head goals scored; 5) Goal difference; 6) Goals scored; 7) Draw.

21 August 2022; 16:00	Egypt	40–23	Libya	BK Arena, Kigali
21 August 2022; 16:00		(19–14)		BK Arena, Kigali

21 August 2022; 18:00	Algeria	31–30	Congo	BK Arena, Kigali
21 August 2022; 18:00		(12–14)		BK Arena, Kigali

22 August 2022; 15:00	Libya	23–38	Algeria	BK Arena, Kigali
22 August 2022; 15:00		(12–23)		BK Arena, Kigali

22 August 2022; 17:00	Egypt	40–23	Congo	BK Arena, Kigali
22 August 2022; 17:00		(21–9)		BK Arena, Kigali

24 August 2022; 13:00	Congo	21–23	Libya	BK Arena, Kigali
24 August 2022; 13:00		(9–11)		BK Arena, Kigali

24 August 2022; 15:00	Algeria	27–39	Egypt	BK Arena, Kigali
24 August 2022; 15:00		(10–17)		BK Arena, Kigali

== Knockout stage ==
=== Bracket ===
Semifinals
26 August
Tunisia	25
Algeria	29
26 August
Egypt	33
Angola	24

Final
27 August
Algeria	15
Egypt	35
Third place
27 August
Tunisia	24
Angola	22

=== Semifinals ===
26 August 2022; 17:00	Tunisia	25–29	Algeria	BK Arena, Kigali
26 August 2022; 17:00		(16–13)		BK Arena, Kigali

26 August 2022; 19:00	Egypt	33–24	Angola	BK Arena, Kigali
26 August 2022; 19:00		(17–12)		BK Arena, Kigali

=== Seventh place game ===
26 August 2022; 13:00	Rwanda	34–35	Congo	BK Arena, Kigali
26 August 2022; 13:00		(15–19)		BK Arena, Kigali

=== Fifth place game ===
26 August 2022
15:00
Morocco
35–34
Libya
BK Arena, Kigali

(17–17)

FT: 31–31 Pen: 4–3

=== Third place game ===
27 August 2022; 17:00	Tunisia	24–22	Angola	BK Arena, Kigali
27 August 2022; 17:00		(11–10)		BK Arena, Kigali

=== Final ===
27 August 2022; 19:00	Algeria	15–35	Egypt	BK Arena, Kigali
27 August 2022; 19:00		(6–16)		BK Arena, Kigali

== Final standings ==
Rank	Team
1st place, gold medalist(s)	Egypt
2nd place, silver medalist(s)	Algeria
3rd place, bronze medalist(s)	Tunisia
4	Angola
5	Morocco
6	Libya
7	Congo
8	Rwanda

Team qualified for the 2023 Junior World Championship
