= 2016 African Men's Junior Handball Championship =

Tournament details
- Host country: Mali
- Venue(s): 1 (in 1 host city)
- Dates: September 11–18, 2016
- Teams: 11 (from 1 confederation)

Final positions
- Champions: Tunisia (4th title)
- Runner-up: Egypt
- Third place: Algeria
- Fourth place: Burkina Faso

Tournament statistics
- Matches played: 15
- Goals scored: 820 (54.67 per match)

The 2016 African Men's Junior Handball Championship was the 21st edition of the tournament, organized by the African Handball Confederation, under the auspices of the International Handball Federation and held at the Palais des Sports de l'ACI 2000 in Bamako, Mali from September 11 to 18, 2016.

Tunisia was the champion and qualified, alongside the three remaining top teams. to the 2017 world championship.

== Teams ==
Participating teams

Algeria
Burkina Faso
Egypt
Mali
Morocco
Tunisia

== Schedule & results ==
Times given below are in GMT UTC+0.

11 Sep, 2016
14:00	Burkina Faso	30 (15:15) 30	Morocco
16:00	Algeria	21 (13:13) 28	Egypt
18:00	Mali	15 (07:24) 49	Tunisia
13 Sep, 2016
14:00	Tunisia	39 (23:06) 14	Burkina Faso
16:00	Algeria	39 (17:06) 22	Morocco
18:00	Egypt	57 (30:08) 23	Mali
15 Sep, 2016
14:00	Morocco	15 (06:19) 43	Tunisia
16:00	Burkina Faso	23 (07:19) 34	Egypt
18:00	Mali	19 (10:23) 43	Algeria
16 Sep, 2016
14:00	Egypt	30 (18:09) 22	Morocco
16:00	Tunisia	23 (12:10) 21	Algeria
18:00	Burkina Faso	20 (12:06) 14	Mali
18 Sep, 2016
14:00	Algeria	23 (11:09) 15	Burkina Faso
16:00	Mali	21 (08:08) 28	Morocco
18:00	Tunisia	30 (14:14) 29	Egypt

Team	Pld	W	D	L	GF	GA	GDIF	Pts
Tunisia	5	5	0	0	184	94	+90	10
Egypt	5	4	0	1	178	119	+59	8
Algeria	5	3	0	2	147	107	+40	6
Burkina Faso	5	1	1	3	102	140	-38	3
Morocco	5	1	1	3	117	163	-46	3
Mali	5	0	0	5	92	197	-105	0

- Note: Qualified to the 2017 World Championship

== Final standings ==
Qualified for the 2017 World Championship

Rank	Team	Record
Gold medal	Tunisia	5–0
Silver medal	Egypt	4–1
Bronze medal	Algeria	3–2
4	Burkina Faso	1–3
5	Morocco	1–3
6	Mali	0–5

== Awards ==
2016 African Men's Junior Handball Championship winner

Tunisia
4th title

Best Player

== See also ==
- 2016 African Men's Handball Championship
- 2016 African Men's Youth Handball Championship
