= Algeria men's national junior handball team =

Algeria

Information
- Association: Algerian Handball Federation
- Coach: Abderrahmane Hadj Hamdri

Colours
1st	2nd

Results

IHF U-21 World Championship
- Appearances: 12 (First in 1987)
- Best result: 12th: 1987

African Championship
- Appearances: 20 (First in 1980)
- Best result: Winner (2): 1986, 1988
- Last updated on Unknown.

The Algeria national junior handball team is the national under–21 handball team that represents Algeria in international handball competitions. It is controlled by the Algerian Handball Federation.

== History ==
=== World Championship record ===
Year	Round	Position	GP	W	D	L	GS	GA	GD
(Sweden) 1977	Did Not Qualified								
(Denmark) / (Sweden) 1979	Did Not Qualified								
(Portugal) 1981	Did Not Qualified								
(Finland) 1983	Did Not Qualified								
(Italy) 1985	Did Not Qualified								
(Socialist Federal Republic of Yugoslavia) 1987	Preliminary round	12th	8	0	3	5	144	164	–20
(Spain) 1989	Preliminary round	14th	6	3	0	3	144	141	+3
(Greece) 1991	Did Not Qualified								
(Egypt) 1993	Preliminary round	13th	6	4	0	2	125	123	+2
(Argentina) 1995	Did Not Qualified								
(Turkey) 1997	Did Not Qualified								
(Qatar) 1999	Did Not Qualified								
(Switzerland) 2001	Main round	12th	10	1	1	8	241	308	–67
(Brazil) 2003	Preliminary round	18th	8	2	0	6	191	224	–33
(Hungary) 2005	Did Not Qualified								
(North Macedonia) 2007	Did Not Qualified								
(Egypt) 2009	Preliminary round	19th	7	2	1	4	203	121	–18
(Greece) 2011	Round of 16	14th	9	4	0	5	239	238	+1
(Bosnia and Herzegovina) 2013	Preliminary round	24th	7	0	0	7	163	210	−47
(Brazil) 2015	Preliminary round	20th	7	1	0	6	161	206	−45
(Algeria) 2017	Round of 16	14th	7	2	2	3	158	159	−1
(Spain) 2019	Did Not Qualified								
(Germany) (Greece) 2023	Preliminary round	22nd	7	2	1	4	183	202	−19
(Poland) 2025	Preliminary round	20th	7	2	1	4	172	200	−28
Total	12/24	0 Titles	89	23	9	57	2124	2296	−172

=== African Championship record ===
Year	Round	Position	GP	W	D	L	GS	GA	GD
(Nigeria) 1980		Third Place	0	0	0	0	0	0	0
(Benin) 1982		Runners–up	0	0	0	0	0	0	0
(Nigeria) 1984		Third Place	0	0	0	0	0	0	0
(Algeria) 1986		Winner	0	0	0	0	0	0	0
(Tunisia) 1988		Winner	0	0	0	0	0	0	0
(Egypt) 1990		Runners–up	0	0	0	0	0	0	0
(Tunisia) 1992		Runners–up	0	0	0	0	0	0	0
(Egypt) 1996		Runners–up	0	0	0	0	0	0	0
(Ivory Coast) 1998	Did Not Qualified								
(Tunisia) 2000		Third Place	0	0	0	0	0	0	0
(Benin) 2002		Third Place	5	3	1	1	133	114	+19
(Ivory Coast) 2004	Did Not Qualified								
(Ivory Coast) 2006		4th	5	2	0	3	143	140	+3
(Libya) 2008		4th	4	2	0	2	136	133	+3
(Gabon) 2010		Third Place	6	5	0	1	184	149	+35
(Ivory Coast) 2012		4th	6	3	0	3	172	146	+26
(Kenya) 2014		4th	4	1	0	3	106	110	−4
(Mali) 2016		Third Place	5	3	0	2	147	107	+40
(Morocco) 2018		5th	6	1	2	3	138	170	−32
(Rwanda) 2022		Runners–up	5	3	0	2	140	152	−12
(Tunisia) 2024		Third Place	6	4	0	2	186	179	+7
(Ivory Coast) 2026		10th							
Total	20/22	2 Titles							

== Squad ==
- 2017 Men's Junior World Handball Championship
- Manager: (Algeria) Rabah Gherbi
- Assistant coach: (Algeria) Rachid Chikh
- Team Assistant: (Algeria) Ahmed Djerana
- Physiotherapist: (Algeria) MAHIOUT Belkacem
- Team Doctor : (Algeria) Djamel Reggad

Algeria national junior handball team roster
No.	Pos.	Player name	Date of birth	Height	Weight	Current Club
1	Back	Brahim Khemici	11 July 1996	1.90 m (6 ft 3 in)	69 kg (152 lb)	(Algeria) MC Saida
2	Centre back	Zoheir Naim	3 May 1996	1.88 m (6 ft 2 in)	87 kg (192 lb)	(Algeria) JSE Skikda
4	Left back	Noureddine Hellal	23 May 1996	1.86 m (6 ft 1 in)	90 kg (200 lb)	(Algeria) Tadjenannt
6	Right back	Mokhtar Kouri	29 February 1996	1.96 m (6 ft 5 in)	80 kg (180 lb)	(Algeria) MC Saida
7	Right wing	El Hadj Abderrahmane Fredj	4 January 1996	1.73 m (5 ft 8 in)	65 kg (143 lb)	(Algeria) O El Oued
8	Center back	Rafik Meklout	22 January 1996	1.82 m (6 ft 0 in)	80 kg (180 lb)	(Algeria) Arzew
9	Left wing	Yassine Benmesaoud	14 November 1996	1.88 m (6 ft 2 in)	77 kg (170 lb)	(Algeria) CRB Baraki
17	Left wing	Yacine Djedid	6 April 1997	1.75 m (5 ft 9 in)	76 kg (168 lb)	(Algeria) GS Petroliers
18	Pivot	Abderraouf Segueni	8 September 1996	1.79 m (5 ft 10 in)	92 kg (203 lb)	(Algeria) CR Bordj Bou Areridj
19	Pivot	Merouane Hammad	20 October 1996	1.85 m (6 ft 1 in)	80 kg (180 lb)	(Algeria) GS Petroliers
22	Goalkeeper	Khalifa Ghedbane	26 November 1996	2.00 m (6 ft 7 in)	100 kg (220 lb)	(Algeria) GS Petroliers
23	Left back	Moustafa Hadj Sadok	17 August 1997	1.92 m (6 ft 4 in)	83 kg (183 lb)	(Algeria) CRB Baraki
27	Right back	Oussama Djema	1 January 1996	1.89 m (6 ft 2 in)	87 kg (192 lb)	(Algeria) CR El Arrouch
46	Left back	Zakaria Bentaieb	23 April 1996	1.98 m (6 ft 6 in)	69 kg (152 lb)	(Algeria) OM Annaba
77	Right wing	Nidhal Baha Djeghaba	9 November 1996	1.73 m (5 ft 8 in)	63 kg (139 lb)	(Algeria) ES Ain Touta
87	Right back	Ayoub Abdi	16 February 1997	1.97 m (6 ft 6 in)	95 kg (209 lb)	(Algeria) CR Bordj Bou Areridj

Legend

GK-Goalkeeper, LW-Left Winger, RW-Right Winger, LP-Line Player, BP-Back, LB-Left Back, CB-Center Back, RB-Right Back.
