= 2024 African Men's Junior Handball Championship =

Tournament details
- Host country: Tunisia
- Venue(s): 2 (in 2 host cities)
- Dates: 9–16 September
- Teams: 8 (from 1 confederation)

Final positions
- Champions: Egypt (14th title)
- Runners-up: Tunisia
- Third place: Algeria
- Fourth place: Morocco

Tournament statistics
- Matches played: 24
- Goals scored: 1,454 (60.58 per match)

The 2024 African Men's Junior Handball Championship was held in Tunisia from 9 to 16 September 2024. It also acted as a qualification tournament for the 2025 IHF Men's U21 Handball World Championship.

== Draw ==
The draw was held on 19 August 2024 at the head office of the African Handball Confederation in Abidjan, Ivory Coast.

== Preliminary round ==
All times are local (UTC+1).

=== Group A ===
Pos	Team	Pld	W	D	L	GF	GA	GD	Pts	Qualification
1	Egypt	3	3	0	0	130	73	+57	6	Quarterfinals
2	Morocco	3	2	0	1	111	68	+43	4	Quarterfinals
3	Guinea	3	1	0	2	85	116	−31	2	Quarterfinals
4	Mali	3	0	0	3	54	123	−69	0	Quarterfinals

Updated to match(es) played on 10 September 2024. Source:
Rules for classification: 1) Points; 2) Head-to-head points; 3) Head-to-head goal difference; 4) Head-to-head goals scored; 5) Goal difference; 6) Goals scored; 7) Draw.

9 September 2024; 12:00	Morocco	37–26	Guinea	Mahdia
9 September 2024; 12:00		(15–10)		Mahdia

9 September 2024; 15:00	Egypt	45–18	Mali	Ksour Essef
9 September 2024; 15:00		(19–10)		Ksour Essef

10 September 2024; 15:00	Guinea	28–56	Egypt	Mahdia
10 September 2024; 15:00		(15–30)		Mahdia

10 September 2024; 16:00	Mali	13–47	Morocco	Ksour Essef
10 September 2024; 16:00		(4–20)		Ksour Essef

11 September 2024; 15:00	Egypt	29–27	Morocco	Mahdia
11 September 2024; 15:00		(18–14)		Mahdia

11 September 2024; 16:00	Guinea	31–23	Mali	Ksour Essef
11 September 2024; 16:00		(14–7)		Ksour Essef

=== Group B ===
Pos	Team	Pld	W	D	L	GF	GA	GD	Pts	Qualification
1	Tunisia (H)	3	3	0	0	98	74	+24	6	Quarterfinals
2	Algeria	3	2	0	1	95	86	+9	4	Quarterfinals
3	Rwanda	3	1	0	2	108	113	−5	2	Quarterfinals
4	Libya	3	0	0	3	80	109	−29	0	Quarterfinals

Updated to match(es) played on 10 September 2024. Source:
Rules for classification: 1) Points; 2) Head-to-head points; 3) Head-to-head goal difference; 4) Head-to-head goals scored; 5) Goal difference; 6) Goals scored; 7) Draw.
(H) Hosts

9 September 2024; 12:00	Algeria	38–35	Rwanda	Ksour Essef
9 September 2024; 12:00		(19–15)		Ksour Essef

9 September 2024; 18:00	Tunisia	31–21	Libya	Mahdia
9 September 2024; 18:00		(14–10)		Mahdia

10 September 2024; 18:00	Rwanda	30–39	Tunisia	Mahdia
10 September 2024; 18:00		(15–16)		Mahdia

10 September 2024; 18:00	Libya	23–34	Algeria	Ksour Essef
10 September 2024; 18:00		(10–17)		Ksour Essef

11 September 2024; 18:00	Algeria	23–28	Tunisia	Mahdia
11 September 2024; 18:00		(8–9)		Mahdia

11 September 2024; 18:00	Libya	36–43	Rwanda	Ksour Essef
11 September 2024; 18:00		(15–17)		Ksour Essef

== Knockout stage ==
=== Bracket ===
Quarter-finals
13 September
Egypt	39
Libya	15
13 September
Algeria (ET)	36
Guinea	35
13 September
Rwanda	30
Morocco	34
13 September
Tunisia	44
Mali	15

Semifinals
14 September
Egypt	38
Algeria	32
14 September
Morocco	21
Tunisia	22

Final
16 September
Egypt	29
Tunisia	25
Third place
16 September
Algeria	23
Morocco	20

5–8th place semifinals
14 September
Libya	35
Guinea	40
14 September
Rwanda	40
Mali	27

Fifth place
15 September
Guinea	35
Rwanda	32
Seventh place
15 September
Libya	44
Mali	25

=== Quarterfinals ===
13 September 2024
15:00
Algeria
36–35 (ET)
Guinea
Mahdia

(12–10)

FT: 29–29 ET: 7–6

13 September 2024; 15:00	Rwanda	30–34	Morocco	Ksour Essef
13 September 2024; 15:00		(13–16)		Ksour Essef

13 September 2024; 18:00	Tunisia	44–15	Mali	Mahdia
13 September 2024; 18:00		(21–5)		Mahdia

13 September 2024; 18:00	Egypt	39–15	Libya	Ksour Essef
13 September 2024; 18:00		(25–7)		Ksour Essef

=== 5–8th place semifinals ===
14 September 2024; 16:00	Libya	35–40	Guinea	Ksour Essef
14 September 2024; 16:00		(18–21)		Ksour Essef

14 September 2024; 18:00	Rwanda	40–27	Mali	Ksour Essef
14 September 2024; 18:00		(20–13)		Ksour Essef

=== Semifinals ===
14 September 2024; 15:00	Egypt	38–32	Algeria	Mahdia
14 September 2024; 15:00		(21–16)		Mahdia

14 September 2024; 18:30	Morocco	21–22	Tunisia	Mahdia
14 September 2024; 18:30		(7–11)		Mahdia

=== Seventh place game ===
15 September 2024; 16:00	Libya	44–25	Mali	Ksour Essef
15 September 2024; 16:00		(18–8)		Ksour Essef

=== Fifth place game ===
15 September 2024; 16:00	Guinea	35–32	Rwanda	Mahdia
15 September 2024; 16:00		(12–14)		Mahdia

=== Third place game ===
16 September 2024; 15:30	Algeria	23–20	Morocco	Mahdia
16 September 2024; 15:30		(9–11)		Mahdia

=== Final ===
16 September 2024; 18:00	Egypt	29–25	Tunisia	Mahdia
16 September 2024; 18:00		(17–11)		Mahdia

== Final standings ==
Rank	Team
1st place, gold medalist(s)	Egypt
2nd place, silver medalist(s)	Tunisia
3rd place, bronze medalist(s)	Algeria
4	Morocco
5	Guinea
6	Rwanda
7	Libya
8	Mali

Team qualified for the 2025 U21 World Championship
