= 2020 Asian Men's Junior Handball Championship =

2020 handball championship in Asia

17th Asian Men's Junior (U-21) Handball Championship 2020
Tournament details
- Host country: Bahrain
- Venue(s): 1 (in 1 host city)
- Dates: Cancelled
- Teams: 10 (from 1 confederation)

The 2020 Asian Men's Junior Handball Championship would have been the 17th edition of the Asian Men's Junior Handball Championship, a biannual championship in handball organised by the Asian Handball Federation (AHF).

It was originally scheduled to take place from 10 to 21 July 2020 in Shiraz, I. R. Iran, but was postponed due to the COVID-19 pandemic. In January 2021, AHF Executive Committee decided to move the event from I. R. Iran due to COVID-19 restrictions in the country and awarded the event to Bahrain Handball Federation scheduled to take place from 20 to 29 March 2021. On 22 February 2021, the AHF cancelled the tournament because of the pandemic.

== Teams ==
Following 10 teams intended to participate in the championship. The draw was scheduled to be held on Thursday, 25 February 2021 at 18:00 (UTC+03:00) at the Bahrain Handball Federation Headquarter, Manama, Bahrain.

- Bahrain
- India
- Iran
- Iraq
- Kuwait
- Oman
- Qatar
- Saudi Arabia
- South Korea
- Uzbekistan
