= 2021 Men's Junior World Handball Championship =

Cancelled handball tournament

2021 Men's Junior (U-21) World Handball Championship
Tournament details
- Host country: Hungary
- Dates: Cancelled
- Teams: 32 (from 5 confederations)

The 2021 IHF Men's Junior World Championship would have been the 23rd edition of the tournament, to be held in Budapest, Hungary in 2021. It would have been second time that Hungary hosted the championship after 2005.

On 22 February 2021, the tournament was cancelled due to the COVID-19 pandemic.

== Bidding process ==
Greece, Hungary and Romania were bidding to host the 2021 Men's Junior World Championship. The championship was awarded during the 36th IHF Congress at Antalya, Turkey on Saturday, 11 November 2017.

Greece was the host of the 1991 Men's Junior World Handball Championship and the 2011 Men's Junior World Handball Championship. Greece was awarded with the 2021 Men's Youth World Handball Championship.

Hungary hosted the 2005 Men's Junior World Handball Championship and was host of the 1982 World Women's Handball Championship. Hungary was also co-host of 1995 World Women's Handball Championship.

Romania hosted the 1962 World Women's Handball Championship, 1977 Women's Junior World Handball Championship and also awarded with 2020 Women's Junior World Handball Championship.

== Qualification ==
Event	Host	Dates	Vacancies	Qualified
XXXVI IHF Congress	(Turkey) Antalya	11 November 2017	1	Hungary
European Qualification		TBD	13	
2020 Asian Men's Junior Handball Championship	(Bahrain) Manama	20–29 March 2021	4	
2020 African Men's Junior Handball Championship	(Morocco) Marrakesh	6–13 March 2021	6	
2021 South and Central American Men's Junior Handball Championship		April/May 2021	4	
2021 North America and Caribbean Men's Junior Handball Championship		April/May 2021	2	
2020 IHF Trophy Oceania Continental Phase		TBD	1	
2021 IHF Inter-Continental Trophy		April/May 2021	1	
