= Juan Rana =

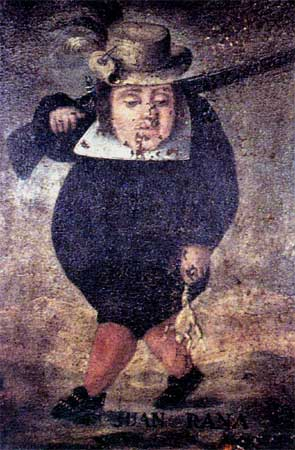
- Juan Rana, late 17th century. Anonymous painting kept in the Royal Spanish Academy.
- Born: Cosme Pérez c. 1593; Spain
- Died: 1672; Madrid, Spain
- Occupations: Actor, comedian
- Years active: 1617-1672

Cosme Pérez (early April 1593 – April 20, 1672),, better known by his stage name Juan Rana ("John Frog") was a Spanish comic actor of the Golden Age. He starred in entremeses—interludes featured between the main acts of full-length plays.

Pedro Calderón de la Barca considered him the best gracioso in Spain, and Juan Caramuel wrote that "Just by stepping onto the stage, and without speaking, he would provoke laughter and applause from those who saw him".

In many of his appearances, Juan Rana wore women's clothing, and he usually portrayed characters that defied gender norms. In 1636 he was arrested for homosexuality but released immediately afterwards, due to his popularity and contacts within the aristocracy.

== Portrait ==
The only known image of Juan Rana is a 17th-century portrait that is currently held at the Royal Spanish Academy. At that time, it was unusual for an actor to be portrayed, as this was reserved for the aristocracy.

In the painting, Juan Rana can be seen as a huntsman, holding a musket or arquebus and a frog he has just caught. Beneath the figure is the inscription "Juan Rana", which was added later, probably in the 18th or 19th century.

The portrait might have served as inspiration for three entremeses: El retrato de Juan Rana [Juan Rana's portrait] (1652) by Antonio de Solís, El retrato vivo [The living portrait] (1657) by Agustín de Moreto, and El retrato de Juan Rana [Juan Rana's portrait] (1657) by Sebastián de Villaviciosa.

== Entremeses ==
The following entremeses were written specifically for Juan Rana, and many of them had his name in the title. Among the authors were notable playwrights, such as Pedro Calderón de la Barca, Agustín Moreto y Cavana and Luis Quiñones de Benavente.

- El Alcalde de Alcorcón [The Mayor of Alcorcón]
- El Ayo [The Tutor]
- La boda de Juan Rana [The Wedding of Juan Rana]
- El casamentero [The Matchmaker]
- El Doctor Juan Rana [Doctor Juan Rana]
- Los dos Juan Rana [The Two Juan Ranas]
- El fénix Juan Rana [The Phoenix Juan Rana]
- Juan Rana en el Prado [Juan Rana in the Prado]
- Juan Rana casado [Juan Rana Married]
- Juan Rana comilón [Juan Rana the Glutton]
- Juan Rana mujer [Juan Rana as a Woman]
- El infierno de Juan Rana [The Hell of Juan Rana]
- El guardainfante [The Farthingale]
- El hidalgo [The Gentleman]
- Juan Rana enamorado [Juan Rana in Love]
- Las fiestas del aldea [The Village Festivities]
- La loa de Juan Rana [The Prologue of Juan Rana]
- Los locos [The Madmen]
- Juan Rana poeta [Juan Rana the Poet]
- El maestro de armas [The Fencing Master]
- Los muertos vivos [The Living Dead]
- El niño caballero [The Boy Knight]
- Pipote con nombre de Juan Rana [Pipote Named Juan Rana]
- El retrato de Juan Rana [The Portrait of Juan Rana]
- El remediador [The Healer]
- El parto de Juan Rana [The Childbirth of Juan Rana]
- El retrato de Juan Rana [The Portrait of Juan Rana]
- La portería de las damas [The Ladies’ Gatehouse]
- El soldado [The Soldier]
- Los sitios de recreación del rey [The King’s Leisure Places]
- El desafío de Juan Rana [The Challenge of Juan Rana]
- El triunfo de Juan Rana [The Triumph of Juan Rana]
- El toreador [The Bullfighter]
- El saltaembanco [The Quack Doctor]
- Una rana hace ciento [One Frog Makes a Hundred]
- La visita de la cárcel [The Visit to the Jail]
- El ventero [The Innkeeper]
- Entremés de Villalpando [Interlude of Villalpando]
- La visita de la cárcel [The Visit to the Jail]
- Las visiones [The Visions]
- Los volatines [The Acrobats]

== Bibliography ==
- Cotarelo y Mori, Emilio (1911). Colección de entremeses, loas, bailes, jácaras y mojigangas desde fines del siglo XVI à mediados del XVIII [Collection of entremeses, loas, dances, jácaras, and mojigangas from the late 16th century to the mid-18th century] (in Spanish). Vol. 1. Madrid, Spain: Madrid Bailly-Baillière.
- Huerta Calvo, Javier (2005). Teatro español (de la A a la Z) [Spanish Theatre (from A to Z)] (in Spanish). Madrid, Spain: Espasa.
