= 2017 Men's Junior World Handball Championship =

2017 Men's Junior (U-21) World Handball Championship

Tournament details
- Host country: Algeria
- Venues: 2 (in 1 host city)
- Dates: 18–30 July
- Teams: 24 (from 4 confederations)

Final positions
- Champions: Spain (1st title)
- Runners-up: Denmark
- Third place: France
- Fourth place: Germany

Tournament statistics
- Matches played: 92
- Goals scored: 5,132 (55.78 per match)
- Attendance: 132,803 (1,444 per match)
- Top scorer(s): (Denmark) Lasse Møller (Tunisia) Skander Zaïdi (76 goals each)

Awards
- Best player: (Denmark) Lasse Møller

The 2017 IHF Men's Junior World Championship was the 21st edition of the tournament, held in Algiers, Algeria from 18 to 30 July 2017. It was the first time that Algeria staged the competition, and the third time that it was held in Africa.

Spain won their first title by defeating Denmark 39–38 in the final. France captured the bronze medal after they beat Germany 23–22.

== Venues ==
The games of the tournament were played in Algiers.

Algiers		2017 Men's Junior World Handball Championship is located in Algeria
Hacène Harcha Arena; Capacity: 8,500	La Coupole d’Alger Arena; Capacity: 5,000	2017 Men's Junior World Handball Championship is located in Algeria

== Qualified teams ==
Competition	Dates	Vacancies	Qualified
Host nation		1	Algeria
2015 Men's Youth World Handball Championship	7–20 August 2015	1	France
2016 Asian Men's Junior Handball Championship	22 July–1 August 2016	3	Qatar; Saudi Arabia; South Korea
2016 European Men's U-20 Handball Championship	28 July–7 August 2016	4	Spain; Germany; Croatia; Norway
2016 African Men's Junior Handball Championship	11–18 September 2016	4	Tunisia; Egypt; Burkina Faso; Morocco
European qualification tournament	4–8 January 2017	8	Denmark; Faroe Islands; Hungary; Iceland; Macedonia; Russia; Slovenia; Sweden
2017 Pan American Men's Junior Handball Championship	20–25 March 2017	3	Brazil; Argentina; Chile

== Draw ==
The draw was held on 10 May 2017.

=== Seedings ===
The seedings were announced on 8 May 2017.

Pot 1	Pot 2	Pot 3	Pot 4	Pot 5	Pot 6
France; Spain; Germany; Croatia	Tunisia; Norway; Denmark; Iceland	Macedonia; Algeria; Faroe Islands; Qatar	Hungary; Egypt; Saudi Arabia; Brazil	Slovenia; Burkina Faso; South Korea; Argentina	Russia; Morocco; Sweden; Chile

== Referees ==
15 referee pairs are selected:

Referees
Austria	Radojko Brkić; Andrej Jusufhodžić
Russia	Nikolaj Volodkov; Evgenij Zotin
Algeria	Yousef Belkhiri; Si Ali Hamidi
Brazil	Adriano Alves Rocha; Daniel Magalhães Da Silva
Bahrain	Hussain Al-Mawt; Samer Marhoon
Bosnia and Herzegovina	Amar Konjičanin; Dino Konjičanin
Spain	Javier Álvarez Mata; Yon Bustamente Lopez
Turkey	Erdogan Kursad; Ibrahim Özdeniz

Referees
Iceland	Svavar Pétursson; Arnar Sigurjónsson
Norway	Lars Jørum; Havard Kleven
France	Karim Gasmi; Raouf Gasmi
Hungary	Miklos Andorka; Robert Hucker
Sweden	Mirza Kurtagic; Mattias Wetterwik
Tunisia	Samir Krichen; Samir Makhlouf
Togo	Yao Akpatsa; Agbeko Assignon

== Preliminary round ==
The schedule was announced on 7 June 2017.

All times are local (UTC+1).

=== Group A ===
Pos	Team	Pld	W	D	L	GF	GA	GD	Pts	Qualification
1	Germany	5	5	0	0	185	128	+57	10	Round of 16
2	Norway	5	4	0	1	160	122	+38	8	Round of 16
3	Hungary	5	3	0	2	154	132	+22	6	Round of 16
4	Faroe Islands	5	2	0	3	126	145	−19	4	Round of 16
5	South Korea	5	1	0	4	151	176	−25	2	
6	Chile	5	0	0	5	121	194	−73	0	

Source: IHF
Rules for classification: 1) points; 2) head-to-head points; 3) head-to-head goal difference; 4) head-to-head number of goals scored; 5) Goal difference.

18 July 2017; 10:00	Germany	25–21	Hungary	La Coupole D’Alger Arena, Algiers; Attendance: 200; Referees: Brkić, Jusufhodžić (AUT)
18 July 2017; 10:00	Mertens 8	(11–12)	Győri 6	La Coupole D’Alger Arena, Algiers; Attendance: 200; Referees: Brkić, Jusufhodžić (AUT)
18 July 2017; 10:00	2× (yellow card) 8× (suspension) 1× (red card)	Report	2× (yellow card) 6× (suspension)	La Coupole D’Alger Arena, Algiers; Attendance: 200; Referees: Brkić, Jusufhodžić (AUT)

18 July 2017; 12:00	Norway	31–29	South Korea	La Coupole D’Alger Arena, Algiers; Attendance: 200; Referees: Volodkov, Zotin (RUS)
18 July 2017; 12:00	Gulliksen 8	(13–13)	Kim Y. 8	La Coupole D’Alger Arena, Algiers; Attendance: 200; Referees: Volodkov, Zotin (RUS)
18 July 2017; 12:00	4× (yellow card) 3× (suspension)	Report	2× (yellow card) 3× (suspension)	La Coupole D’Alger Arena, Algiers; Attendance: 200; Referees: Volodkov, Zotin (RUS)

18 July 2017; 14:00	Faroe Islands	31–28	Chile	La Coupole D’Alger Arena, Algiers; Attendance: 200; Referees: Belkhiri, Hamidi (ALG)
18 July 2017; 14:00	Johansen 5	(14–12)	Gómez 11	La Coupole D’Alger Arena, Algiers; Attendance: 200; Referees: Belkhiri, Hamidi (ALG)
18 July 2017; 14:00	2× (yellow card) 6× (suspension)	Report	1× (yellow card) 5× (suspension)	La Coupole D’Alger Arena, Algiers; Attendance: 200; Referees: Belkhiri, Hamidi (ALG)

20 July 2017; 16:00	Hungary	22–31	Norway	La Coupole D’Alger Arena, Algiers; Attendance: 300; Referees: Alves, Magalhães (BRA)
20 July 2017; 16:00	Győri 6	(13–20)	Schoenningsen 6	La Coupole D’Alger Arena, Algiers; Attendance: 300; Referees: Alves, Magalhães (BRA)
20 July 2017; 16:00	2× (yellow card) 6× (suspension)	Report	3× (yellow card) 9× (suspension)	La Coupole D’Alger Arena, Algiers; Attendance: 300; Referees: Alves, Magalhães (BRA)

20 July 2017; 18:00	Chile	25–51	Germany	La Coupole D’Alger Arena, Algiers; Attendance: 300; Referees: Al-Mawt, Marhoon (BHR)
20 July 2017; 18:00	Hernández 11	(10–26)	three players 6	La Coupole D’Alger Arena, Algiers; Attendance: 300; Referees: Al-Mawt, Marhoon (BHR)
20 July 2017; 18:00	3× (yellow card) 4× (suspension) 1× (red card)	Report	3× (yellow card) 3× (suspension)	La Coupole D’Alger Arena, Algiers; Attendance: 300; Referees: Al-Mawt, Marhoon (BHR)

20 July 2017; 20:00	South Korea	27–28	Faroe Islands	La Coupole D’Alger Arena, Algiers; Attendance: 400; Referees: Konjičanin, Konjičanin (BIH)
20 July 2017; 20:00	three players 4	(12–16)	Jakobsen 6	La Coupole D’Alger Arena, Algiers; Attendance: 400; Referees: Konjičanin, Konjičanin (BIH)
20 July 2017; 20:00	3× (suspension)	Report	3× (suspension)	La Coupole D’Alger Arena, Algiers; Attendance: 400; Referees: Konjičanin, Konjičanin (BIH)

21 July 2017; 16:00	Germany	48–33	South Korea	La Coupole D’Alger Arena, Algiers; Attendance: 500; Referees: Pétursson, Sigurjónsson (ISL)
21 July 2017; 16:00	Mertens, Semper 9	(25–13)	Kim T. 5	La Coupole D’Alger Arena, Algiers; Attendance: 500; Referees: Pétursson, Sigurjónsson (ISL)
21 July 2017; 16:00	3× (yellow card) 8× (suspension)	Report	1× (yellow card) 4× (suspension)	La Coupole D’Alger Arena, Algiers; Attendance: 500; Referees: Pétursson, Sigurjónsson (ISL)

21 July 2017; 18:00	Norway	29–23	Faroe Islands	La Coupole D’Alger Arena, Algiers; Attendance: 300; Referees: Belkhiri, Hamidi (ALG)
21 July 2017; 18:00	Gulliksen 6	(15–8)	Jakobsen 7	La Coupole D’Alger Arena, Algiers; Attendance: 300; Referees: Belkhiri, Hamidi (ALG)
21 July 2017; 18:00	4× (yellow card) 4× (suspension)	Report	1× (yellow card) 4× (suspension)	La Coupole D’Alger Arena, Algiers; Attendance: 300; Referees: Belkhiri, Hamidi (ALG)

21 July 2017; 20:00	Hungary	39–23	Chile	La Coupole D’Alger Arena, Algiers; Attendance: 200; Referees: Krichen, Makhlouf (TUN)
21 July 2017; 20:00	Fekete 6	(18–13)	Hernández 6	La Coupole D’Alger Arena, Algiers; Attendance: 200; Referees: Krichen, Makhlouf (TUN)
21 July 2017; 20:00	2× (yellow card) 3× (suspension)	Report	1× (yellow card) 3× (suspension)	La Coupole D’Alger Arena, Algiers; Attendance: 200; Referees: Krichen, Makhlouf (TUN)

23 July 2017; 16:00	Norway	41–16	Chile	La Coupole D’Alger Arena, Algiers; Attendance: 350; Referees: Akpatsa, Assignon (TOG)
23 July 2017; 16:00	Hauane 9	(17–11)	three players 3	La Coupole D’Alger Arena, Algiers; Attendance: 350; Referees: Akpatsa, Assignon (TOG)
23 July 2017; 16:00	2× (yellow card) 2× (suspension)	Report	3× (yellow card) 3× (suspension)	La Coupole D’Alger Arena, Algiers; Attendance: 350; Referees: Akpatsa, Assignon (TOG)

23 July 2017; 18:00	Faroe Islands	21–29	Germany	La Coupole D’Alger Arena, Algiers; Attendance: 400; Referees: Belkhiri, Hamidi (ALG)
23 July 2017; 18:00	four players 3	(12–9)	three players 5	La Coupole D’Alger Arena, Algiers; Attendance: 400; Referees: Belkhiri, Hamidi (ALG)
23 July 2017; 18:00	3× (yellow card) 5× (suspension)	Report	2× (yellow card) 6× (suspension)	La Coupole D’Alger Arena, Algiers; Attendance: 400; Referees: Belkhiri, Hamidi (ALG)

23 July 2017; 20:00	South Korea	30–40	Hungary	La Coupole D’Alger Arena, Algiers; Attendance: 300; Referees: Krichen, Makhlouf (TUN)
23 July 2017; 20:00	Kim J. 7	(15–20)	Ligetvári 9	La Coupole D’Alger Arena, Algiers; Attendance: 300; Referees: Krichen, Makhlouf (TUN)
23 July 2017; 20:00	1× (yellow card) 2× (suspension)	Report	3× (yellow card) 12× (suspension)	La Coupole D’Alger Arena, Algiers; Attendance: 300; Referees: Krichen, Makhlouf (TUN)

24 July 2017; 16:00	South Korea	32–29	Chile	La Coupole D’Alger Arena, Algiers; Attendance: 400; Referees: Belkhiri, Hamidi (ALG)
24 July 2017; 16:00	Kim J. 8	(19–14)	López 6	La Coupole D’Alger Arena, Algiers; Attendance: 400; Referees: Belkhiri, Hamidi (ALG)
24 July 2017; 16:00	1× (yellow card) 3× (suspension)	Report	3× (yellow card) 6× (suspension)	La Coupole D’Alger Arena, Algiers; Attendance: 400; Referees: Belkhiri, Hamidi (ALG)

24 July 2017; 18:00	Faroe Islands	23–32	Hungary	La Coupole D’Alger Arena, Algiers; Attendance: 400; Referees: Alves, Magalhães (BRA)
24 July 2017; 18:00	Hansen 5	(12–18)	Győri 8	La Coupole D’Alger Arena, Algiers; Attendance: 400; Referees: Alves, Magalhães (BRA)
24 July 2017; 18:00	3× (yellow card) 5× (suspension) 1× (red card)	Report	2× (yellow card) 2× (suspension) 1× (red card)	La Coupole D’Alger Arena, Algiers; Attendance: 400; Referees: Alves, Magalhães (BRA)

24 July 2017; 20:00	Germany	32–28	Norway	La Coupole D’Alger Arena, Algiers; Attendance: 800; Referees: Gasmi, Gasmi (FRA)
24 July 2017; 20:00	Golla 7	(14–16)	Fredriksen 6	La Coupole D’Alger Arena, Algiers; Attendance: 800; Referees: Gasmi, Gasmi (FRA)
24 July 2017; 20:00	2× (yellow card) 4× (suspension)	Report	2× (yellow card) 5× (suspension) 1× (red card)	La Coupole D’Alger Arena, Algiers; Attendance: 800; Referees: Gasmi, Gasmi (FRA)

=== Group B ===
Pos	Team	Pld	W	D	L	GF	GA	GD	Pts	Qualification
1	France	5	4	1	0	154	120	+34	9	Round of 16
2	Slovenia	5	4	1	0	145	126	+19	9	Round of 16
3	Denmark	5	3	0	2	147	134	+13	6	Round of 16
4	Sweden	5	2	0	3	138	143	−5	4	Round of 16
5	Egypt	5	1	0	4	130	154	−24	2	
6	Qatar	5	0	0	5	117	154	−37	0	

Source: IHF
Rules for classification: 1) points; 2) head-to-head points; 3) head-to-head goal difference; 4) head-to-head number of goals scored; 5) Goal difference.

18 July 2017; 16:00	France	36–30	Egypt	La Coupole D’Alger Arena, Algiers; Attendance: 300; Referees: Alves, Magalhães (BRA)
18 July 2017; 16:00	Richardson 6	(16–15)	Abdou 7	La Coupole D’Alger Arena, Algiers; Attendance: 300; Referees: Alves, Magalhães (BRA)
18 July 2017; 16:00	3× (yellow card) 2× (suspension)	Report	4× (yellow card) 2× (suspension)	La Coupole D’Alger Arena, Algiers; Attendance: 300; Referees: Alves, Magalhães (BRA)

18 July 2017; 18:00	Denmark	30–33	Slovenia	La Coupole D’Alger Arena, Algiers; Attendance: 400; Referees: Álvarez, Bustamente (ESP)
18 July 2017; 18:00	Augustinussen 8	(11–15)	three players 7	La Coupole D’Alger Arena, Algiers; Attendance: 400; Referees: Álvarez, Bustamente (ESP)
18 July 2017; 18:00	1× (yellow card) 7× (suspension)	Report	2× (yellow card) 7× (suspension)	La Coupole D’Alger Arena, Algiers; Attendance: 400; Referees: Álvarez, Bustamente (ESP)

18 July 2017; 20:00	Qatar	21–22	Sweden	La Coupole D’Alger Arena, Algiers; Attendance: 300; Referees: Erdoğan, Özdeniz (TUR)
18 July 2017; 20:00	Dhiab 9	(10–12)	Hansson 6	La Coupole D’Alger Arena, Algiers; Attendance: 300; Referees: Erdoğan, Özdeniz (TUR)
18 July 2017; 20:00	2× (yellow card) 7× (suspension) 1× (red card)	Report	1× (yellow card) 6× (suspension)	La Coupole D’Alger Arena, Algiers; Attendance: 300; Referees: Erdoğan, Özdeniz (TUR)

19 July 2017; 16:00	Egypt	20–26	Denmark	La Coupole D’Alger Arena, Algiers; Attendance: 300; Referees: Volodkov, Zotin (RUS)
19 July 2017; 16:00	Abdou 7	(11–15)	Augustinussen 9	La Coupole D’Alger Arena, Algiers; Attendance: 300; Referees: Volodkov, Zotin (RUS)
19 July 2017; 16:00	2× (yellow card) 6× (suspension)	Report	3× (yellow card) 3× (suspension)	La Coupole D’Alger Arena, Algiers; Attendance: 300; Referees: Volodkov, Zotin (RUS)

19 July 2017; 18:00	Sweden	28–31	France	La Coupole D’Alger Arena, Algiers; Attendance: 500; Referees: Pétursson, Sigurjónsson (ISL)
19 July 2017; 18:00	three players 5	(19–19)	Mem 8	La Coupole D’Alger Arena, Algiers; Attendance: 500; Referees: Pétursson, Sigurjónsson (ISL)
19 July 2017; 18:00	3× (yellow card) 4× (suspension)	Report	2× (yellow card) 4× (suspension)	La Coupole D’Alger Arena, Algiers; Attendance: 500; Referees: Pétursson, Sigurjónsson (ISL)

19 July 2017; 20:00	Slovenia	31–23	Qatar	La Coupole D’Alger Arena, Algiers; Attendance: 300; Referees: Konjičanin, Konjičanin (BIH)
19 July 2017; 20:00	Knavs, Vlah 6	(15–12)	Heiba 8	La Coupole D’Alger Arena, Algiers; Attendance: 300; Referees: Konjičanin, Konjičanin (BIH)
19 July 2017; 20:00	3× (yellow card) 6× (suspension)	Report	2× (yellow card) 2× (suspension)	La Coupole D’Alger Arena, Algiers; Attendance: 300; Referees: Konjičanin, Konjičanin (BIH)

21 July 2017; 10:00	France	22–22	Slovenia	La Coupole D’Alger Arena, Algiers; Attendance: 400; Referees: Jørum, Kleven (NOR)
21 July 2017; 10:00	Lenne 6	(12–12)	Cvetko 5	La Coupole D’Alger Arena, Algiers; Attendance: 400; Referees: Jørum, Kleven (NOR)
21 July 2017; 10:00	2× (yellow card) 2× (suspension)	Report	2× (yellow card) 4× (suspension)	La Coupole D’Alger Arena, Algiers; Attendance: 400; Referees: Jørum, Kleven (NOR)

21 July 2017; 12:00	Denmark	36–26	Qatar	La Coupole D’Alger Arena, Algiers; Attendance: 300; Referees: Alves, Magalhães (BRA)
21 July 2017; 12:00	three players 5	(19–13)	Heiba 7	La Coupole D’Alger Arena, Algiers; Attendance: 300; Referees: Alves, Magalhães (BRA)
21 July 2017; 12:00	2× (yellow card) 3× (suspension)	Report	2× (yellow card) 1× (suspension)	La Coupole D’Alger Arena, Algiers; Attendance: 300; Referees: Alves, Magalhães (BRA)

21 July 2017; 14:00	Egypt	27–35	Sweden	La Coupole D’Alger Arena, Algiers; Attendance: 300; Referees: Álvarez, Bustamente (ESP)
21 July 2017; 14:00	Omar 6	(11–15)	Jönsson 9	La Coupole D’Alger Arena, Algiers; Attendance: 300; Referees: Álvarez, Bustamente (ESP)
21 July 2017; 14:00	2× (yellow card) 6× (suspension)	Report	3× (yellow card) 2× (suspension)	La Coupole D’Alger Arena, Algiers; Attendance: 300; Referees: Álvarez, Bustamente (ESP)

22 July 2017; 16:00	Denmark	33–25	Sweden	La Coupole D’Alger Arena, Algiers; Attendance: 500; Referees: Erdoğan, Özdeniz (TUR)
22 July 2017; 16:00	Møller 10	(19–11)	Dahlin, Hansson 5	La Coupole D’Alger Arena, Algiers; Attendance: 500; Referees: Erdoğan, Özdeniz (TUR)
22 July 2017; 16:00	3× (yellow card) 6× (suspension)	Report	3× (yellow card) 2× (suspension)	La Coupole D’Alger Arena, Algiers; Attendance: 500; Referees: Erdoğan, Özdeniz (TUR)

22 July 2017; 18:00	Qatar	18–35	France	La Coupole D’Alger Arena, Algiers; Attendance: 1,000; Referees: Brkić, Jusufhodžić (AUT)
22 July 2017; 18:00	three players 3	(7–17)	Mocquais 7	La Coupole D’Alger Arena, Algiers; Attendance: 1,000; Referees: Brkić, Jusufhodžić (AUT)
22 July 2017; 18:00	2× (yellow card) 1× (suspension)	Report	1× (yellow card) 1× (suspension)	La Coupole D’Alger Arena, Algiers; Attendance: 1,000; Referees: Brkić, Jusufhodžić (AUT)

22 July 2017; 20:00	Slovenia	28–23	Egypt	La Coupole D’Alger Arena, Algiers; Attendance: 500; Referees: Andorka, Hucker (HUN)
22 July 2017; 20:00	Marguč 11	(18–12)	Omar 11	La Coupole D’Alger Arena, Algiers; Attendance: 500; Referees: Andorka, Hucker (HUN)
22 July 2017; 20:00	3× (yellow card) 5× (suspension)	Report	2× (yellow card) 4× (suspension) 1× (red card)	La Coupole D’Alger Arena, Algiers; Attendance: 500; Referees: Andorka, Hucker (HUN)

24 July 2017; 10:00	Slovenia	31–28	Sweden	La Coupole D’Alger Arena, Algiers; Attendance: 200; Referees: Pétursson, Sigurjónsson (ISL)
24 July 2017; 10:00	Marguč 8	(15–15)	Hansson 8	La Coupole D’Alger Arena, Algiers; Attendance: 200; Referees: Pétursson, Sigurjónsson (ISL)
24 July 2017; 10:00	3× (yellow card) 6× (suspension)	Report	3× (yellow card) 4× (suspension)	La Coupole D’Alger Arena, Algiers; Attendance: 200; Referees: Pétursson, Sigurjónsson (ISL)

24 July 2017; 12:00	Qatar	29–30	Egypt	La Coupole D’Alger Arena, Algiers; Attendance: 350; Referees: Konjičanin, Konjičanin (BIH)
24 July 2017; 12:00	Heiba 8	(16–15)	El-Baghoury 6	La Coupole D’Alger Arena, Algiers; Attendance: 350; Referees: Konjičanin, Konjičanin (BIH)
24 July 2017; 12:00	2× (yellow card) 4× (suspension)	Report	2× (yellow card) 2× (suspension)	La Coupole D’Alger Arena, Algiers; Attendance: 350; Referees: Konjičanin, Konjičanin (BIH)

24 July 2017; 14:00	France	30–22	Denmark	La Coupole D’Alger Arena, Algiers; Referees: Álvarez, Bustamente (ESP)
24 July 2017; 14:00	Mem 7	(12–9)	Møller 8	La Coupole D’Alger Arena, Algiers; Referees: Álvarez, Bustamente (ESP)
24 July 2017; 14:00	3× (yellow card) 3× (suspension)	Report	3× (yellow card) 2× (suspension)	La Coupole D’Alger Arena, Algiers; Referees: Álvarez, Bustamente (ESP)

=== Group C ===
Pos	Team	Pld	W	D	L	GF	GA	GD	Pts	Qualification
1	Spain	5	5	0	0	159	105	+54	10	Round of 16
2	Macedonia	5	3	0	2	157	133	+24	6	Round of 16
3	Tunisia	5	2	1	2	161	134	+27	5	Round of 16
4	Russia	5	2	1	2	145	118	+27	5	Round of 16
5	Brazil	5	2	0	3	137	126	+11	4	
6	Burkina Faso	5	0	0	5	75	218	−143	0	

Source: IHF
Rules for classification: 1) points; 2) head-to-head points; 3) head-to-head goal difference; 4) head-to-head number of goals scored; 5) Goal difference.

18 July 2017; 10:00	Spain	29–21	Brazil	Hacène Harcha Arena, Algiers; Attendance: 500; Referees: Gasmi, Gasmi (FRA)
18 July 2017; 10:00	Gómez 7	(15–9)	Abrahão 8	Hacène Harcha Arena, Algiers; Attendance: 500; Referees: Gasmi, Gasmi (FRA)
18 July 2017; 10:00	3× (yellow card) 4× (suspension)	Report	1× (yellow card) 7× (suspension) 1× (red card)	Hacène Harcha Arena, Algiers; Attendance: 500; Referees: Gasmi, Gasmi (FRA)

18 July 2017; 12:00	Tunisia	50–17	Burkina Faso	Hacène Harcha Arena, Algiers; Attendance: 500; Referees: Al-Mawt, Marhoon (BHR)
18 July 2017; 12:00	Gouri 13	(23–7)	Nadziga 5	Hacène Harcha Arena, Algiers; Attendance: 500; Referees: Al-Mawt, Marhoon (BHR)
18 July 2017; 12:00	3× (yellow card) 3× (suspension)	Report	1× (yellow card) 7× (suspension) 1× (red card)	Hacène Harcha Arena, Algiers; Attendance: 500; Referees: Al-Mawt, Marhoon (BHR)

18 July 2017; 14:00	Macedonia	29–22	Russia	Hacène Harcha Arena, Algiers; Attendance: 2,000; Referees: Andorka, Hucker (HUN)
18 July 2017; 14:00	Arsenovski 7	(10–11)	Maslennikov, Sinitcyn 5	Hacène Harcha Arena, Algiers; Attendance: 2,000; Referees: Andorka, Hucker (HUN)
18 July 2017; 14:00	2× (yellow card) 4× (suspension) 2× (red card)	Report	1× (yellow card) 4× (suspension)	Hacène Harcha Arena, Algiers; Attendance: 2,000; Referees: Andorka, Hucker (HUN)

20 July 2017; 16:00	Brazil	36–29	Tunisia	Hacène Harcha Arena, Algiers; Attendance: 400; Referees: Brkić, Jusufhodžić (AUT)
20 July 2017; 16:00	Dutra 9	(18–11)	Zaïdi 10	Hacène Harcha Arena, Algiers; Attendance: 400; Referees: Brkić, Jusufhodžić (AUT)
20 July 2017; 16:00	2× (yellow card) 5× (suspension)	Report	3× (yellow card) 3× (suspension)	Hacène Harcha Arena, Algiers; Attendance: 400; Referees: Brkić, Jusufhodžić (AUT)

20 July 2017; 18:00	Russia	26–31	Spain	Hacène Harcha Arena, Algiers; Attendance: 300; Referees: Pétursson, Sigurjónsson (ISL)
20 July 2017; 18:00	Dashko 8	(15–17)	Odriozola 8	Hacène Harcha Arena, Algiers; Attendance: 300; Referees: Pétursson, Sigurjónsson (ISL)
20 July 2017; 18:00	3× (yellow card) 2× (suspension)	Report	3× (yellow card) 5× (suspension)	Hacène Harcha Arena, Algiers; Attendance: 300; Referees: Pétursson, Sigurjónsson (ISL)

20 July 2017; 20:00	Burkina Faso	20–48	Macedonia	Hacène Harcha Arena, Algiers; Attendance: 450; Referees: Kurtagic, Wetterwik (SWE)
20 July 2017; 20:00	Tiendrebeogo 7	(8–23)	Dimitrioski 8	Hacène Harcha Arena, Algiers; Attendance: 450; Referees: Kurtagic, Wetterwik (SWE)
20 July 2017; 20:00	4× (yellow card) 2× (suspension)	Report	2× (yellow card) 3× (suspension)	Hacène Harcha Arena, Algiers; Attendance: 450; Referees: Kurtagic, Wetterwik (SWE)

21 July 2017; 14:00	Brazil	20–23	Russia	Hacène Harcha Arena, Algiers; Attendance: 200; Referees: Kurtagic, Wetterwik (SWE)
21 July 2017; 14:00	Lemos 6	(10–11)	Maslennikov, Santalov 4	Hacène Harcha Arena, Algiers; Attendance: 200; Referees: Kurtagic, Wetterwik (SWE)
21 July 2017; 14:00	2× (yellow card) 2× (suspension)	Report	1× (yellow card) 4× (suspension)	Hacène Harcha Arena, Algiers; Attendance: 200; Referees: Kurtagic, Wetterwik (SWE)

21 July 2017; 16:00	Spain	38–12	Burkina Faso	Hacène Harcha Arena, Algiers; Attendance: 500; Referees: Akpatsa, Assignon (TOG)
21 July 2017; 16:00	Odriozola, Gómez 6	(16–7)	M. Ouedragogo 3	Hacène Harcha Arena, Algiers; Attendance: 500; Referees: Akpatsa, Assignon (TOG)
21 July 2017; 16:00	3× (yellow card) 3× (suspension)	Report	1× (yellow card) 3× (suspension)	Hacène Harcha Arena, Algiers; Attendance: 500; Referees: Akpatsa, Assignon (TOG)

21 July 2017; 18:00	Tunisia	32–27	Macedonia	Hacène Harcha Arena, Algiers; Attendance: 3,000; Referees: Gasmi, Gasmi (FRA)
21 July 2017; 18:00	Zaïdi 14	(17–13)	Palevski, Taleski 6	Hacène Harcha Arena, Algiers; Attendance: 3,000; Referees: Gasmi, Gasmi (FRA)
21 July 2017; 18:00	2× (yellow card) 5× (suspension)	Report	3× (yellow card) 1× (suspension) 1× (red card)	Hacène Harcha Arena, Algiers; Attendance: 3,000; Referees: Gasmi, Gasmi (FRA)

23 July 2017; 16:00	Tunisia	29–29	Russia	Hacène Harcha Arena, Algiers; Attendance: 1,000; Referees: Jørum, Kleven (NOR)
23 July 2017; 16:00	Zaïdi 12	(15–14)	Vinogradov 8	Hacène Harcha Arena, Algiers; Attendance: 1,000; Referees: Jørum, Kleven (NOR)
23 July 2017; 16:00	1× (yellow card) 3× (suspension)	Report	3× (yellow card) 3× (suspension)	Hacène Harcha Arena, Algiers; Attendance: 1,000; Referees: Jørum, Kleven (NOR)

23 July 2017; 18:00	Macedonia	25–36	Spain	Hacène Harcha Arena, Algiers; Attendance: 1,000; Referees: Pétursson, Sigurjónsson (ISL)
23 July 2017; 18:00	Kuzmanovski, Taleski 4	(8–18)	Dujshebaev 7	Hacène Harcha Arena, Algiers; Attendance: 1,000; Referees: Pétursson, Sigurjónsson (ISL)
23 July 2017; 18:00	2× (yellow card) 2× (suspension)	Report	3× (yellow card) 6× (suspension) 1× (red card)	Hacène Harcha Arena, Algiers; Attendance: 1,000; Referees: Pétursson, Sigurjónsson (ISL)

23 July 2017; 20:00	Burkina Faso	17–37	Brazil	Hacène Harcha Arena, Algiers; Attendance: 300; Referees: Andorka, Hucker (HUN)
23 July 2017; 20:00	Tiendrebeogo 11	(8–17)	Torriani 10	Hacène Harcha Arena, Algiers; Attendance: 300; Referees: Andorka, Hucker (HUN)
23 July 2017; 20:00	2× (yellow card) 3× (suspension)	Report	2× (yellow card) 4× (suspension)	Hacène Harcha Arena, Algiers; Attendance: 300; Referees: Andorka, Hucker (HUN)

24 July 2017; 14:00	Spain	25–21	Tunisia	Hacène Harcha Arena, Algiers; Attendance: 600; Referees: Kurtagic, Wetterwik (SWE)
24 July 2017; 14:00	Muñoz 5	(14–12)	Ben Abdallah 6	Hacène Harcha Arena, Algiers; Attendance: 600; Referees: Kurtagic, Wetterwik (SWE)
24 July 2017; 14:00	3× (yellow card) 2× (suspension)	Report	2× (yellow card)	Hacène Harcha Arena, Algiers; Attendance: 600; Referees: Kurtagic, Wetterwik (SWE)

24 July 2017; 16:00	Burkina Faso	9–45	Russia	Hacène Harcha Arena, Algiers; Attendance: 1,200; Referees: Al-Mawt, Marhoon (BHR)
24 July 2017; 16:00	M. Ouedraogo 4	(6–23)	Dashko 11	Hacène Harcha Arena, Algiers; Attendance: 1,200; Referees: Al-Mawt, Marhoon (BHR)
24 July 2017; 16:00	6× (suspension)	Report	2× (yellow card) 4× (suspension)	Hacène Harcha Arena, Algiers; Attendance: 1,200; Referees: Al-Mawt, Marhoon (BHR)

24 July 2017; 18:00	Macedonia	28–23	Brazil	Hacène Harcha Arena, Algiers; Attendance: 5,000; Referees: Erdoğan, Özdeniz (TUR)
24 July 2017; 18:00	Taleski 7	(14–11)	Abrahão, Lemos 4	Hacène Harcha Arena, Algiers; Attendance: 5,000; Referees: Erdoğan, Özdeniz (TUR)
24 July 2017; 18:00	3× (yellow card) 5× (suspension)	Report	4× (yellow card) 2× (suspension)	Hacène Harcha Arena, Algiers; Attendance: 5,000; Referees: Erdoğan, Özdeniz (TUR)

=== Group D ===
Pos	Team	Pld	W	D	L	GF	GA	GD	Pts	Qualification
1	Croatia	5	4	1	0	140	112	+28	9	Round of 16
2	Iceland	5	4	0	1	170	120	+50	8	Round of 16
3	Algeria (H)	5	2	2	1	118	114	+4	6	Round of 16
4	Argentina	5	2	1	2	130	124	+6	5	Round of 16
5	Saudi Arabia	5	1	0	4	123	146	−23	2	
6	Morocco	5	0	0	5	82	147	−65	0	

Updated to match(es) played on 24 July 2017. Source: IHF
Rules for classification: 1) points; 2) head-to-head points; 3) head-to-head goal difference; 4) head-to-head number of goals scored; 5) Goal difference.
(H) Hosts

18 July 2017; 16:00	Croatia	32–26	Saudi Arabia	Hacène Harcha Arena, Algiers; Attendance: 3,000; Referees: Kurtagic, Wetterwik (SWE)
18 July 2017; 16:00	Mandić 10	(17–13)	Al-Olaiwat 10	Hacène Harcha Arena, Algiers; Attendance: 3,000; Referees: Kurtagic, Wetterwik (SWE)
18 July 2017; 16:00	2× (yellow card) 5× (suspension)	Report	1× (yellow card) 8× (suspension) 1× (red card)	Hacène Harcha Arena, Algiers; Attendance: 3,000; Referees: Kurtagic, Wetterwik (SWE)

18 July 2017; 18:00	Iceland	36–27	Argentina	Hacène Harcha Arena, Algiers; Attendance: 1,803; Referees: Krichen, Makhlouf (TUN)
18 July 2017; 18:00	Jónsson 9	(19–12)	Fischer 6	Hacène Harcha Arena, Algiers; Attendance: 1,803; Referees: Krichen, Makhlouf (TUN)
18 July 2017; 18:00	3× (yellow card) 10× (suspension) 1× (red card)	Report	1× (yellow card) 5× (suspension) 1× (red card)	Hacène Harcha Arena, Algiers; Attendance: 1,803; Referees: Krichen, Makhlouf (TUN)

18 July 2017; 20:45	Algeria	24–19	Morocco	Hacène Harcha Arena, Algiers; Attendance: 6,000; Referees: Jørum, Kleven (NOR)
18 July 2017; 20:45	Hadj Sadok 5	(13–8)	Frid 5	Hacène Harcha Arena, Algiers; Attendance: 6,000; Referees: Jørum, Kleven (NOR)
18 July 2017; 20:45	4× (suspension)	Report	3× (yellow card) 5× (suspension)	Hacène Harcha Arena, Algiers; Attendance: 6,000; Referees: Jørum, Kleven (NOR)

19 July 2017; 16:00	Saudi Arabia	24–48	Iceland	Hacène Harcha Arena, Algiers; Attendance: 400; Referees: Gasmi, Gasmi (FRA)
19 July 2017; 16:00	Al-Mesallem 6	(9–24)	Ríkharðsson 8	Hacène Harcha Arena, Algiers; Attendance: 400; Referees: Gasmi, Gasmi (FRA)
19 July 2017; 16:00	2× (yellow card) 2× (suspension)	Report	1× (yellow card) 8× (suspension)	Hacène Harcha Arena, Algiers; Attendance: 400; Referees: Gasmi, Gasmi (FRA)

19 July 2017; 18:00	Morocco	12–29	Croatia	Hacène Harcha Arena, Algiers; Attendance: 400; Referees: Akpatsa, Assignon (TOG)
19 July 2017; 18:00	three players 3	(4–18)	Babić 5	Hacène Harcha Arena, Algiers; Attendance: 400; Referees: Akpatsa, Assignon (TOG)
19 July 2017; 18:00	1× (yellow card) 3× (suspension)	Report	2× (yellow card) 1× (suspension)	Hacène Harcha Arena, Algiers; Attendance: 400; Referees: Akpatsa, Assignon (TOG)

19 July 2017; 20:45	Argentina	25–25	Algeria	Hacène Harcha Arena, Algiers; Attendance: 6,700; Referees: Álvarez, Bustamente (ESP)
19 July 2017; 20:45	L.Moyano 7	(14–11)	Abdi 7	Hacène Harcha Arena, Algiers; Attendance: 6,700; Referees: Álvarez, Bustamente (ESP)
19 July 2017; 20:45	3× (yellow card) 6× (suspension)	Report	2× (yellow card) 6× (suspension)	Hacène Harcha Arena, Algiers; Attendance: 6,700; Referees: Álvarez, Bustamente (ESP)

21 July 2017; 10:00	Croatia	26–24	Argentina	Hacène Harcha Arena, Algiers; Attendance: 400; Referees: Andorka, Hucker (HUN)
21 July 2017; 10:00	Hrstić 9	(13–8)	L.Moyano 5	Hacène Harcha Arena, Algiers; Attendance: 400; Referees: Andorka, Hucker (HUN)
21 July 2017; 10:00	2× (yellow card) 4× (suspension)	Report	1× (yellow card) 3× (suspension)	Hacène Harcha Arena, Algiers; Attendance: 400; Referees: Andorka, Hucker (HUN)

21 July 2017; 12:00	Saudi Arabia	29–19	Morocco	Hacène Harcha Arena, Algiers; Attendance: 400; Referees: Konjičanin, Konjičanin (BIH)
21 July 2017; 12:00	Al-Mesallem 10	(15–10)	Malki 6	Hacène Harcha Arena, Algiers; Attendance: 400; Referees: Konjičanin, Konjičanin (BIH)
21 July 2017; 12:00	2× (yellow card) 4× (suspension)	Report	3× (yellow card) 7× (suspension)	Hacène Harcha Arena, Algiers; Attendance: 400; Referees: Konjičanin, Konjičanin (BIH)

21 July 2017; 20:45	Iceland	25–22	Algeria	Hacène Harcha Arena, Algiers; Attendance: 8,200; Referees: Erdoğan, Özdeniz (TUR)
21 July 2017; 20:45	Arnarsson, Magnússon 5	(10–11)	three players 5	Hacène Harcha Arena, Algiers; Attendance: 8,200; Referees: Erdoğan, Özdeniz (TUR)
21 July 2017; 20:45	3× (yellow card) 3× (suspension)	Report	2× (yellow card) 3× (suspension)	Hacène Harcha Arena, Algiers; Attendance: 8,200; Referees: Erdoğan, Özdeniz (TUR)

22 July 2017; 16:00	Iceland	35–18	Morocco	Hacène Harcha Arena, Algiers; Attendance: 300; Referees: Al-Mawt, Marhoon (BHR)
22 July 2017; 16:00	Pálsson 6	(11–8)	Frid 7	Hacène Harcha Arena, Algiers; Attendance: 300; Referees: Al-Mawt, Marhoon (BHR)
22 July 2017; 16:00	2× (yellow card) 4× (suspension)	Report	3× (yellow card) 6× (suspension) 2× (red card)	Hacène Harcha Arena, Algiers; Attendance: 300; Referees: Al-Mawt, Marhoon (BHR)

22 July 2017; 18:00	Argentina	24–23	Saudi Arabia	Hacène Harcha Arena, Algiers; Attendance: 3,000; Referees: Volodkov, Zotin (RUS)
22 July 2017; 18:00	A. Moyano 9	(13–11)	Aloatwat 7	Hacène Harcha Arena, Algiers; Attendance: 3,000; Referees: Volodkov, Zotin (RUS)
22 July 2017; 18:00	3× (yellow card) 3× (suspension)	Report	2× (yellow card) 5× (suspension)	Hacène Harcha Arena, Algiers; Attendance: 3,000; Referees: Volodkov, Zotin (RUS)

22 July 2017; 20:45	Algeria	24–24	Croatia	Hacène Harcha Arena, Algiers; Attendance: 8,000; Referees: Jørum, Kleven (NOR)
22 July 2017; 20:45	Djedid 6	(9–11)	Hrstić 8	Hacène Harcha Arena, Algiers; Attendance: 8,000; Referees: Jørum, Kleven (NOR)
22 July 2017; 20:45	1× (yellow card) 4× (suspension)	Report	3× (yellow card) 5× (suspension)	Hacène Harcha Arena, Algiers; Attendance: 8,000; Referees: Jørum, Kleven (NOR)

24 July 2017; 10:00	Argentina	30–14	Morocco	Hacène Harcha Arena, Algiers; Attendance: 500; Referees: Volodkov, Zotin (RUS)
24 July 2017; 10:00	Corning 6	(13–7)	Ezzine 3	Hacène Harcha Arena, Algiers; Attendance: 500; Referees: Volodkov, Zotin (RUS)
24 July 2017; 10:00	2× (yellow card) 3× (suspension) 1× (red card)	Report	4× (yellow card) 3× (suspension)	Hacène Harcha Arena, Algiers; Attendance: 500; Referees: Volodkov, Zotin (RUS)

24 July 2017; 12:00	Croatia	29–26	Iceland	Hacène Harcha Arena, Algiers; Attendance: 300; Referees: Krichen, Makhlouf (TUN)
24 July 2017; 12:00	Hrstić 6	(17–8)	Jónsson 7	Hacène Harcha Arena, Algiers; Attendance: 300; Referees: Krichen, Makhlouf (TUN)
24 July 2017; 12:00	2× (yellow card) 4× (suspension) 1× (red card)	Report	2× (yellow card) 5× (suspension) 1× (red card)	Hacène Harcha Arena, Algiers; Attendance: 300; Referees: Krichen, Makhlouf (TUN)

24 July 2017; 20:45	Algeria	23–21	Saudi Arabia	Hacène Harcha Arena, Algiers; Attendance: 9,000; Referees: Brkić, Jusufhodžić (AUT)
24 July 2017; 20:45	Abdi 6	(10–11)	Al-Olaiwat 9	Hacène Harcha Arena, Algiers; Attendance: 9,000; Referees: Brkić, Jusufhodžić (AUT)
24 July 2017; 20:45	2× (yellow card) 1× (suspension)	Report	2× (yellow card) 2× (suspension)	Hacène Harcha Arena, Algiers; Attendance: 9,000; Referees: Brkić, Jusufhodžić (AUT)

== President's Cup ==
17th place bracket

17th–20th place semifinals
26 July
South Korea	34
Egypt	35
26 July
Brazil	41
Saudi Arabia	20

17th place
27 July
Egypt	28
Brazil	27
19th place
27 July
South Korea	36
Saudi Arabia	30

21st place bracket

21st–24th place semifinals
26 July
Chile	22
Qatar	29
26 July
Burkina Faso	21
Morocco	42

21st place
27 July
Qatar	26
Morocco	17
23rd place
27 July
Chile	36
Burkina Faso	21

=== 21st–24th place semifinals ===
26 July 2017; 09:30	Chile	22–29	Qatar	La Coupole D’Alger Arena, Algiers; Attendance: 200; Referees: Akpatsa, Assignon (TOG)
26 July 2017; 09:30	Francisco 6	(13–12)	Damjanović, Dhiab 9	La Coupole D’Alger Arena, Algiers; Attendance: 200; Referees: Akpatsa, Assignon (TOG)
26 July 2017; 09:30	2× (yellow card) 2× (suspension)	Report	1× (suspension)	La Coupole D’Alger Arena, Algiers; Attendance: 200; Referees: Akpatsa, Assignon (TOG)

26 July 2017; 09:30	Burkina Faso	21–42	Morocco	Hacène Harcha Arena, Algiers; Attendance: 300; Referees: Brkić, Jusufhodžić (AUT)
26 July 2017; 09:30	Nadziga 6	(12–21)	Rezzouki 16	Hacène Harcha Arena, Algiers; Attendance: 300; Referees: Brkić, Jusufhodžić (AUT)
26 July 2017; 09:30	3× (yellow card) 3× (suspension)	Report	2× (yellow card) 5× (suspension)	Hacène Harcha Arena, Algiers; Attendance: 300; Referees: Brkić, Jusufhodžić (AUT)

=== 17th–20th place semifinals ===
26 July 2017; 11:45	South Korea	34–35	Egypt	La Coupole D’Alger Arena, Algiers; Attendance: 250; Referees: Al-Mawt, Marhoon (BHR)
26 July 2017; 11:45	Kim J., Park D. 8	(18–15)	El-Baghoury 6	La Coupole D’Alger Arena, Algiers; Attendance: 250; Referees: Al-Mawt, Marhoon (BHR)
26 July 2017; 11:45	3× (yellow card) 3× (suspension)	Report	2× (yellow card) 3× (suspension)	La Coupole D’Alger Arena, Algiers; Attendance: 250; Referees: Al-Mawt, Marhoon (BHR)

26 July 2017; 11:45	Brazil	41–20	Saudi Arabia	Hacène Harcha Arena, Algiers; Attendance: 600; Referees: Pétursson, Sigurjónsson (ISL)
26 July 2017; 11:45	three players 5	(23–13)	Al-Ibrahim 8	Hacène Harcha Arena, Algiers; Attendance: 600; Referees: Pétursson, Sigurjónsson (ISL)
26 July 2017; 11:45	3× (yellow card) 2× (suspension)	Report	1× (yellow card) 3× (suspension)	Hacène Harcha Arena, Algiers; Attendance: 600; Referees: Pétursson, Sigurjónsson (ISL)

=== 23rd place game ===
27 July 2017; 09:30	Chile	36–21	Burkina Faso	La Coupole D’Alger Arena, Algiers; Attendance: 50; Referees: Erdoğan, Özdeniz (TUR)
27 July 2017; 09:30	Francisco 11	(14–11)	Tiendrebeogo 6	La Coupole D’Alger Arena, Algiers; Attendance: 50; Referees: Erdoğan, Özdeniz (TUR)
27 July 2017; 09:30	3× (yellow card) 5× (suspension) 1× (red card)	Report	3× (yellow card) 4× (suspension)	La Coupole D’Alger Arena, Algiers; Attendance: 50; Referees: Erdoğan, Özdeniz (TUR)

=== 21st place game ===
27 July 2017; 11:45	Qatar	26–17	Morocco	La Coupole D’Alger Arena, Algiers; Attendance: 50; Referees: Volodkov, Zotin (RUS)
27 July 2017; 11:45	Dhiab 10	(15–8)	Ezzine 8	La Coupole D’Alger Arena, Algiers; Attendance: 50; Referees: Volodkov, Zotin (RUS)
27 July 2017; 11:45	2× (yellow card) 2× (suspension)	Report	4× (yellow card) 1× (suspension)	La Coupole D’Alger Arena, Algiers; Attendance: 50; Referees: Volodkov, Zotin (RUS)

=== 19th place game ===
27 July 2017; 09:30	South Korea	36–30	Saudi Arabia	Hacène Harcha Arena, Algiers; Attendance: 300; Referees: Akpatsa, Assignon (TOG)
27 July 2017; 09:30	Kim J. 10	(15–14)	Al-Olaiwat 8	Hacène Harcha Arena, Algiers; Attendance: 300; Referees: Akpatsa, Assignon (TOG)
27 July 2017; 09:30	3× (suspension)	Report	5× (suspension)	Hacène Harcha Arena, Algiers; Attendance: 300; Referees: Akpatsa, Assignon (TOG)

=== 17th place game ===
27 July 2017; 11:45	Egypt	28–27	Brazil	Hacène Harcha Arena, Algiers; Attendance: 300; Referees: Belkhiri, Hamidi (ALG)
27 July 2017; 11:45	Omar 9	(16–14)	Silva 6	Hacène Harcha Arena, Algiers; Attendance: 300; Referees: Belkhiri, Hamidi (ALG)
27 July 2017; 11:45	1× (yellow card) 2× (suspension)	Report	3× (yellow card) 5× (suspension)	Hacène Harcha Arena, Algiers; Attendance: 300; Referees: Belkhiri, Hamidi (ALG)

== 9–16th placement games ==
The eight losers of the round of 16 were seeded according to their results in the preliminary round against teams ranked 1–4 and play an elimination game to determine their final position.

Pos	Team	Pld	W	D	L	GF	GA	GD	Pts
1	Slovenia	3	2	1	0	86	80	+6	5
2	Croatia	3	2	1	0	79	74	+5	5
3	Norway	3	2	0	1	88	77	+11	4
4	Iceland	3	2	0	1	87	78	+9	4
5	Algeria	3	0	2	1	71	74	−3	2
6	Argentina	3	0	1	2	76	87	−11	1
7	Sweden	3	0	0	3	81	95	−14	0
8	Faroe Islands	3	0	0	3	67	90	−23	0

Rules for classification: 1) points; 2) goal difference; 3) number of goals scored.

=== 15th place game ===
27 July 2017; 14:00	Sweden	33–21	Faroe Islands	La Coupole D’Alger Arena, Algiers; Attendance: 100; Referees: Alves, Magalhães (BRA)
27 July 2017; 14:00	Vigmark 9	(19–11)	Djurhuus, Egilsnes 4	La Coupole D’Alger Arena, Algiers; Attendance: 100; Referees: Alves, Magalhães (BRA)
27 July 2017; 14:00	3× (yellow card) 2× (suspension)	Report	4× (yellow card) 5× (suspension)	La Coupole D’Alger Arena, Algiers; Attendance: 100; Referees: Alves, Magalhães (BRA)

=== 13th place game ===
27 July 2017; 16:15	Algeria	20–21	Argentina	Hacène Harcha Arena, Algiers; Attendance: 700; Referees: Al-Mawt, Marhoon (BHR)
27 July 2017; 16:15	Blida 5	(11–11)	Capurro 4	Hacène Harcha Arena, Algiers; Attendance: 700; Referees: Al-Mawt, Marhoon (BHR)
27 July 2017; 16:15	3× (yellow card) 1× (suspension)	Report	3× (yellow card) 1× (suspension)	Hacène Harcha Arena, Algiers; Attendance: 700; Referees: Al-Mawt, Marhoon (BHR)

=== Eleventh place game ===
27 July 2017; 14:00	Norway	33–27	Iceland	Hacène Harcha Arena, Algiers; Attendance: 400; Referees: Krichen, Makhlouf (TUN)
27 July 2017; 14:00	three players 6	(20–12)	Rúnarsson 6	Hacène Harcha Arena, Algiers; Attendance: 400; Referees: Krichen, Makhlouf (TUN)
27 July 2017; 14:00	3× (yellow card) 5× (suspension)	Report	2× (yellow card) 3× (suspension)	Hacène Harcha Arena, Algiers; Attendance: 400; Referees: Krichen, Makhlouf (TUN)

=== Ninth place game ===
27 July 2017; 16:15	Slovenia	33–26	Croatia	La Coupole D’Alger Arena, Algiers; Attendance: 200; Referees: Konjičanin, Konjičanin (BIH)
27 July 2017; 16:15	Marguč, Knavs 8	(20–16)	Perić 5	La Coupole D’Alger Arena, Algiers; Attendance: 200; Referees: Konjičanin, Konjičanin (BIH)
27 July 2017; 16:15	2× (yellow card) 2× (suspension)	Report	2× (yellow card) 2× (suspension)	La Coupole D’Alger Arena, Algiers; Attendance: 200; Referees: Konjičanin, Konjičanin (BIH)

== Knockout stage ==
=== Bracket ===
Round of 16
26 July
France	28
Faroe Islands	25
26 July
Algeria	20
Macedonia	24
26 July
Denmark	34
Norway	27
26 July
Croatia	25
Russia	34
26 July
Germany (OT)	31
Sweden	28
26 July
Tunisia	28
Iceland	27
26 July
Hungary (OT)	26
Slovenia	25
26 July
Spain	27
Argentina	21

Quarterfinals
27 July
France	33
Macedonia	17
27 July
Denmark	38
Russia	31
27 July
Germany	27
Tunisia	21
27 July
Hungary	29
Spain (OT)	30

Semifinals
29 July
France	34
Denmark	37
29 July
Germany	21
Spain	26

Final
30 July
Denmark	38
Spain (OT)	39
Third place
30 July
France	23
Germany	22

5th place bracket

5th–8th place Semifinals
29 July
Macedonia	36
Russia	27
29 July
Tunisia	30
Hungary	34

Fifth place
30 July
Macedonia	22
Hungary	26
Seventh place
30 July
Russia	21
Tunisia	36

=== Round of 16 ===
26 July 2017; 14:00	France	28–25	Faroe Islands	La Coupole D’Alger Arena, Algiers; Attendance: 300; Referees: Krichen, Makhlouf (TUN)
26 July 2017; 14:00	Minne 6	(14–12)	Hoydal 9	La Coupole D’Alger Arena, Algiers; Attendance: 300; Referees: Krichen, Makhlouf (TUN)
26 July 2017; 14:00	1× (yellow card) 2× (suspension)	Report	2× (yellow card) 2× (suspension)	La Coupole D’Alger Arena, Algiers; Attendance: 300; Referees: Krichen, Makhlouf (TUN)

26 July 2017; 14:00	Tunisia	28–27	Iceland	Hacène Harcha Arena, Algiers; Attendance: 2,000; Referees: Gasmi, Gasmi (FRA)
26 July 2017; 14:00	Zaïdi 11	(14–13)	Ríkharðsson 8	Hacène Harcha Arena, Algiers; Attendance: 2,000; Referees: Gasmi, Gasmi (FRA)
26 July 2017; 14:00	2× (yellow card) 5× (suspension)	Report	4× (yellow card) 6× (suspension)	Hacène Harcha Arena, Algiers; Attendance: 2,000; Referees: Gasmi, Gasmi (FRA)

26 July 2017
16:15
Germany
31–28 (ET)
Sweden
La Coupole D’Alger Arena, Algiers
Attendance: 600
Referees: Konjičanin, Konjičanin (BIH)
Golla 7
(14–13)
Hansson 9
2× (yellow card) 2× (suspension)
Report
3× (yellow card) 5× (suspension)

FT: 26–26 ET: 5–2

26 July 2017; 16:15	Spain	27–21	Argentina	Hacène Harcha Arena, Algiers; Attendance: 6,000; Referees: Belkhiri, Hamidi (ALG)
26 July 2017; 16:15	Dujshebaev 6	(14–8)	Capurro 4	Hacène Harcha Arena, Algiers; Attendance: 6,000; Referees: Belkhiri, Hamidi (ALG)
26 July 2017; 16:15	2× (yellow card) 5× (suspension)	Report	3× (yellow card) 2× (suspension)	Hacène Harcha Arena, Algiers; Attendance: 6,000; Referees: Belkhiri, Hamidi (ALG)

26 July 2017; 18:30	Croatia	25–34	Russia	Hacène Harcha Arena, Algiers; Attendance: 8,200; Referees: Álvarez, Bustamente (ESP)
26 July 2017; 18:30	Hrstić 7	(10–12)	Santalov 10	Hacène Harcha Arena, Algiers; Attendance: 8,200; Referees: Álvarez, Bustamente (ESP)
26 July 2017; 18:30	2× (yellow card) 1× (suspension)	Report	2× (yellow card) 2× (suspension) 1× (red card)	Hacène Harcha Arena, Algiers; Attendance: 8,200; Referees: Álvarez, Bustamente (ESP)

26 July 2017
18:30
Hungary
26–25 (ET)
Slovenia
La Coupole D’Alger Arena, Algiers
Attendance: 700
Referees: Volodkov, Zotin (RUS)
Török 6
(12–10)
Marguč 6
2× (yellow card) 5× (suspension) 1× (red card)
Report
3× (yellow card)

FT: 21–21 ET: 5–4

26 July 2017; 20:45	Algeria	20–24	Macedonia	Hacène Harcha Arena, Algiers; Attendance: 10,000; Referees: Andorka, Hucker (HUN)
26 July 2017; 20:45	Naim 8	(11–10)	Taleski 8	Hacène Harcha Arena, Algiers; Attendance: 10,000; Referees: Andorka, Hucker (HUN)
26 July 2017; 20:45	2× (yellow card) 1× (suspension)	Report	3× (yellow card) 2× (suspension)	Hacène Harcha Arena, Algiers; Attendance: 10,000; Referees: Andorka, Hucker (HUN)

26 July 2017; 20:45	Denmark	34–27	Norway	La Coupole D’Alger Arena, Algiers; Attendance: 500; Referees: Erdoğan, Özdeniz (TUR)
26 July 2017; 20:45	Møller 11	(13–12)	Gulliksen 6	La Coupole D’Alger Arena, Algiers; Attendance: 500; Referees: Erdoğan, Özdeniz (TUR)
26 July 2017; 20:45	2× (yellow card) 2× (suspension)	Report	3× (yellow card) 3× (suspension)	La Coupole D’Alger Arena, Algiers; Attendance: 500; Referees: Erdoğan, Özdeniz (TUR)

=== Quarterfinals ===
27 July 2017; 18:30	France	33–17	Macedonia	Hacène Harcha Arena, Algiers; Attendance: 800; Referees: Brkić, Jusufhodžić (AUT)
27 July 2017; 18:30	Mocquais, Richardson 5	(14–9)	Taleski 4	Hacène Harcha Arena, Algiers; Attendance: 800; Referees: Brkić, Jusufhodžić (AUT)
27 July 2017; 18:30	2× (yellow card) 3× (suspension)	Report	2× (yellow card) 3× (suspension)	Hacène Harcha Arena, Algiers; Attendance: 800; Referees: Brkić, Jusufhodžić (AUT)

27 July 2017; 18:30	Tunisia	21–27	Germany	La Coupole D’Alger Arena, Algiers; Attendance: 1,000; Referees: Jørum, Kleven (NOR)
27 July 2017; 18:30	Zaïdi 8	(11–14)	Mertens 6	La Coupole D’Alger Arena, Algiers; Attendance: 1,000; Referees: Jørum, Kleven (NOR)
27 July 2017; 18:30	1× (yellow card) 5× (suspension)	Report	2× (yellow card) 4× (suspension)	La Coupole D’Alger Arena, Algiers; Attendance: 1,000; Referees: Jørum, Kleven (NOR)

27 July 2017; 20:45	Denmark	38–31	Russia	Hacène Harcha Arena, Algiers; Attendance: 600; Referees: Pétursson, Sigurjónsson (ISL)
27 July 2017; 20:45	Møller 9	(15–12)	Maslennikov 7	Hacène Harcha Arena, Algiers; Attendance: 600; Referees: Pétursson, Sigurjónsson (ISL)
27 July 2017; 20:45	3× (yellow card) 3× (suspension)	Report	3× (yellow card) 6× (suspension)	Hacène Harcha Arena, Algiers; Attendance: 600; Referees: Pétursson, Sigurjónsson (ISL)

27 July 2017
20:45
Hungary
29–30 (ET)
Spain
La Coupole D’Alger Arena, Algiers
Attendance: 1,100
Referees: Kurtagic, Wetterwik (SWE)
Győri 9
(12–15)
Gómez 7
3× (yellow card) 7× (suspension)
Report
4× (yellow card) 1× (suspension)

FT: 24–24 ET: 5–6

=== 5th–8th place semifinals ===
29 July 2017; 12:30	Macedonia	36–27	Russia	Hacène Harcha Arena, Algiers; Attendance: 100; Referees: Belkhiri, Hamidi (ALG)
29 July 2017; 12:30	Kuzmanovski 7	(21–11)	Maslennikov 7	Hacène Harcha Arena, Algiers; Attendance: 100; Referees: Belkhiri, Hamidi (ALG)
29 July 2017; 12:30	1× (yellow card) 1× (suspension)	Report	3× (yellow card) 8× (suspension) 2× (red card)	Hacène Harcha Arena, Algiers; Attendance: 100; Referees: Belkhiri, Hamidi (ALG)

29 July 2017; 15:00	Tunisia	30–34	Hungary	Hacène Harcha Arena, Algiers; Attendance: 1,000; Referees: Gasmi, Gasmi (FRA)
29 July 2017; 15:00	Ghachem 8	(14–17)	Győri 7	Hacène Harcha Arena, Algiers; Attendance: 1,000; Referees: Gasmi, Gasmi (FRA)
29 July 2017; 15:00	1× (yellow card) 2× (suspension)	Report	4× (yellow card) 9× (suspension)	Hacène Harcha Arena, Algiers; Attendance: 1,000; Referees: Gasmi, Gasmi (FRA)

=== Semifinals ===
29 July 2017; 17:30	France	34–37	Denmark	Hacène Harcha Arena, Algiers; Attendance: 4,000; Referees: Álvarez, Bustamente (ESP)
29 July 2017; 17:30	Mem 8	(16–17)	Bitsch 11	Hacène Harcha Arena, Algiers; Attendance: 4,000; Referees: Álvarez, Bustamente (ESP)
29 July 2017; 17:30	3× (yellow card) 2× (suspension)	Report	3× (yellow card) 3× (suspension)	Hacène Harcha Arena, Algiers; Attendance: 4,000; Referees: Álvarez, Bustamente (ESP)

29 July 2017; 20:00	Germany	21–26	Spain	Hacène Harcha Arena, Algiers; Attendance: 3,500; Referees: Erdoğan, Özdeniz (TUR)
29 July 2017; 20:00	Michalczik, Weissgerber 5	(11–12)	Gómez 10	Hacène Harcha Arena, Algiers; Attendance: 3,500; Referees: Erdoğan, Özdeniz (TUR)
29 July 2017; 20:00	4× (yellow card) 3× (suspension)	Report	4× (yellow card) 3× (suspension)	Hacène Harcha Arena, Algiers; Attendance: 3,500; Referees: Erdoğan, Özdeniz (TUR)

=== Seventh place game ===
30 July 2017; 10:30	Russia	21–36	Tunisia	Hacène Harcha Arena, Algiers; Attendance: 300; Referees: Alves, Magalhães (BRA)
30 July 2017; 10:30	Vinogradov 7	(9–18)	Ben Abdallah, Zaïdi 8	Hacène Harcha Arena, Algiers; Attendance: 300; Referees: Alves, Magalhães (BRA)
30 July 2017; 10:30	3× (yellow card) 8× (suspension) 1× (red card)	Report	3× (yellow card) 2× (suspension)	Hacène Harcha Arena, Algiers; Attendance: 300; Referees: Alves, Magalhães (BRA)

=== Fifth place game ===
30 July 2017; 13:00	Macedonia	22–26	Hungary	Hacène Harcha Arena, Algiers; Attendance: 500; Referees: Konjičanin, Konjičanin (BIH)
30 July 2017; 13:00	Neloski 6	(11–14)	Kovács 8	Hacène Harcha Arena, Algiers; Attendance: 500; Referees: Konjičanin, Konjičanin (BIH)
30 July 2017; 13:00	3× (yellow card) 3× (suspension)	Report	1× (yellow card) 5× (suspension)	Hacène Harcha Arena, Algiers; Attendance: 500; Referees: Konjičanin, Konjičanin (BIH)

=== Third place game ===
30 July 2017; 15:30	France	23–22	Germany	Hacène Harcha Arena, Algiers; Attendance: 3,000; Referees: Kurtagić, Wetterwik (SWE)
30 July 2017; 15:30	Pelayo 6	(10–12)	three players 4	Hacène Harcha Arena, Algiers; Attendance: 3,000; Referees: Kurtagić, Wetterwik (SWE)
30 July 2017; 15:30	3× (yellow card) 3× (suspension)	Report	2× (yellow card) 1× (suspension)	Hacène Harcha Arena, Algiers; Attendance: 3,000; Referees: Kurtagić, Wetterwik (SWE)

=== Final ===
30 July 2017
18:00
Denmark
38–39 (ET)
Spain
Hacène Harcha Arena, Algiers
Attendance: 8,500
Referees: Jørum, Kleven (NOR)
Møller 11
(16–18)
Dujshebaev 8
2× (yellow card) 4× (suspension)
Report
2× (yellow card) 3× (suspension)

FT: 34–34 ET: 4–5

== Final ranking ==
Rank	Team
Gold medal	Spain
Silver medal	Denmark
Bronze medal	France
4	Germany
5	Hungary
6	Macedonia
7	Tunisia
8	Russia
9	Slovenia
10	Croatia
11	Norway
12	Iceland
13	Argentina
14	Algeria
15	Sweden
16	Faroe Islands
17	Egypt
18	Brazil
19	South Korea
20	Saudi Arabia
21	Qatar
22	Morocco
23	Chile
24	Burkina Faso

== Statistics ==
=== Top goalscorers ===
Rank	Name	Team	Goals	Shots	%
1	Skander Zaïdi	Tunisia	76	118	64.4
1	Lasse Møller	Denmark	76	119	63.9
3	Aleix Gomez	Spain	55	76	72.4
4	Mátyás Győri	Hungary	49	75	65.3
5	Gal Marguč	Slovenia	46	56	82.1
6	Kim Ji-hoon	South Korea	45	59	76.3
6	Anouar Ben Abdallah	Tunisia	45	79	57.0
8	Daniel Dujshebaev	Spain	44	76	57.9
9	Dmitrii Santalov	Russia	43	81	53.1
9	Mustafa Al-Olaiwat	Saudi Arabia	43	86	50.0

Source: IHF

=== Top goalkeepers ===
Rank	Name	Team	%	Saves	Shots
1	Julien Meyer	France	37.3	120	322
2	Xoan Ledo	Spain	35.8	103	288
3	Simon Gade	Denmark	31.3	99	316
4	Urh Kastelic	Slovenia	36.4	94	258
5	Denis Zabolotin	Russia	29.0	81	279
6	Khalifa Ghedbane	Algeria	33.9	80	236
7	Imre Pasztor	Hungary	36.0	76	211
8	Parada Nicolas	Chile	30.5	74	243
9	Martin Tomovski	Macedonia	29.1	69	237
10	Joel Birlehm	Germany	34.0	67	197

Source: IHF

== Awards ==
=== MVP ===
- Left-back: (Denmark) Lasse Møller

=== All-star team ===
- Goalkeeper: (Spain) Xoan Ledo
- Right wing: (Spain) Aleix Gómez
- Right back: (France) Dika Mem
- Centre back: (Hungary) Mátyás Győri
- Left back: (Denmark) Lasse Møller
- Left wing: (Germany) Lukas Mertens
- Pivot: (Denmark) Magnus Saugstrup
