= Lasse Møller =

Danish handball player (born 1996)

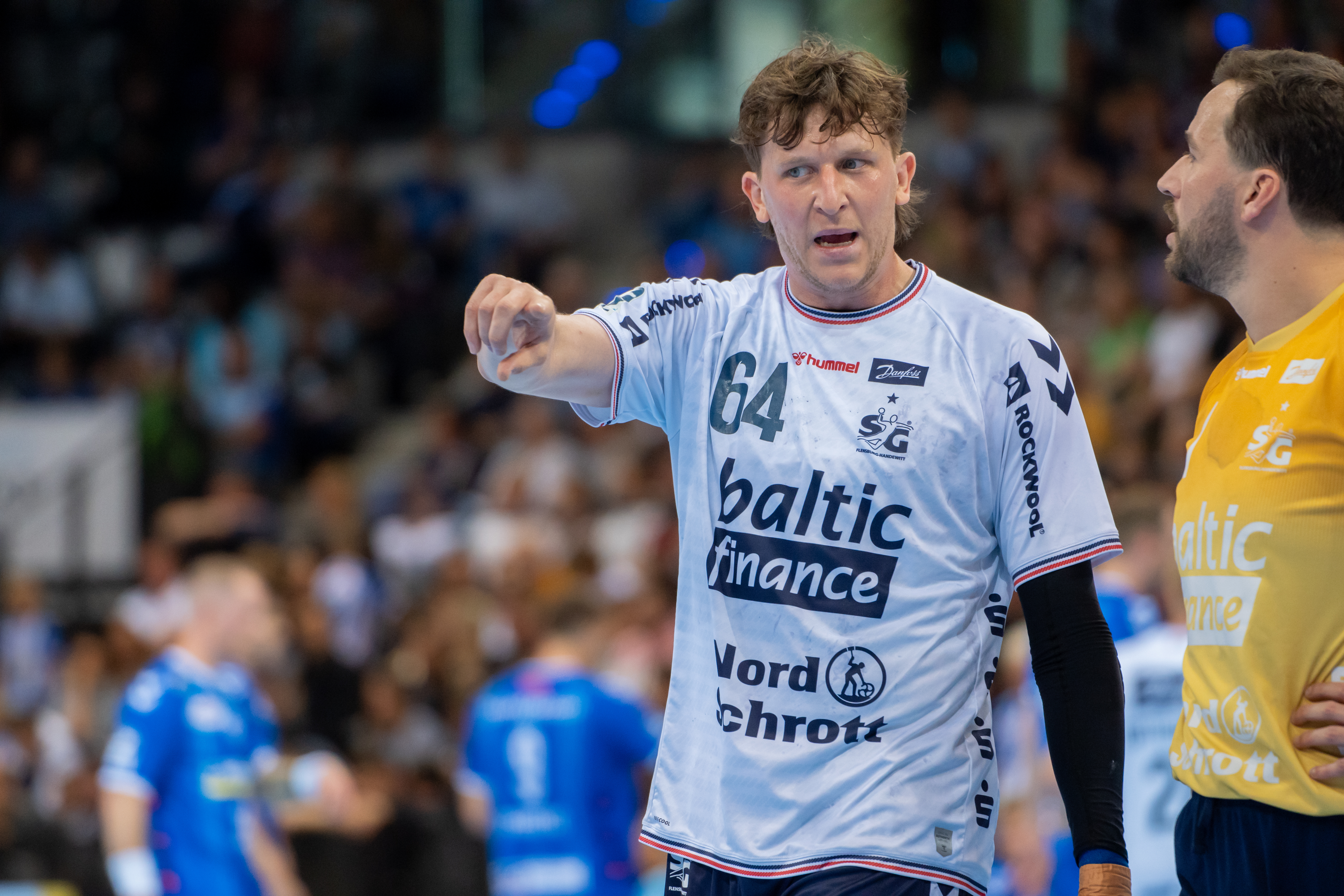

Personal information
- Full name: Lasse Kjær Møller
- Nationality: Danish
- Born: 11 June 1996 (age 30) Gudme, Denmark
- Height: 1.99 m (6 ft 6 in)

Sport
- Sport: Handball
- Position: Left back
- Current club: SG Flensburg-Handewitt
- Number: 64

Youth career
- Years: Team
- -2013: GOG Håndbold

Senior clubs
- Years: Team
- 2013–2020: GOG Håndbold
- 2020–: SG Flensburg-Handewitt
National team
Years	Team	Apps	(Gls)
2017–	Denmark	19	(22)
Medal record
World Championship
Gold medal – first place	2023 Poland/Sweden
European Championship
Gold medal – first place	2026 Denmark/Norway/Sweden
Junior World Championship
Silver medal – second place	2017 Algeria
- Updated on 2 December 2025

Lasse Møller (born 11 June 1996) is a Danish handball player who plays for SG Flensburg-Handewitt and the Danish national team. He has also played several matches for the Danish national junior and youth teams.

In the 2019/20 season he scored the second most goals in the Danish handball league. In May 2019, he signed a contract with the German club SG Flensburg-Handewitt starting at the 2020/21 season.

He made his debut on the Danish national team on 26 October 2017. In 2023 he was part of the Danish team that won the 2023 World Handball Championship.

At the 2026 European Men's Handball Championship he won gold medals, meaning that Denmark held both the World, European and Olympic titles at the same time, as only the second team ever after France's 'Les Experts'. He acted mainly as a back-up during the tournament to Simon Pytlick.

== Individual awards ==
- Most Valuable Player of the IHF Men's Junior World Championship: 2017
- Top scorer of the IHF Men's Junior World Championship: 2017
