= Filip Taleski =

Macedonian handball player

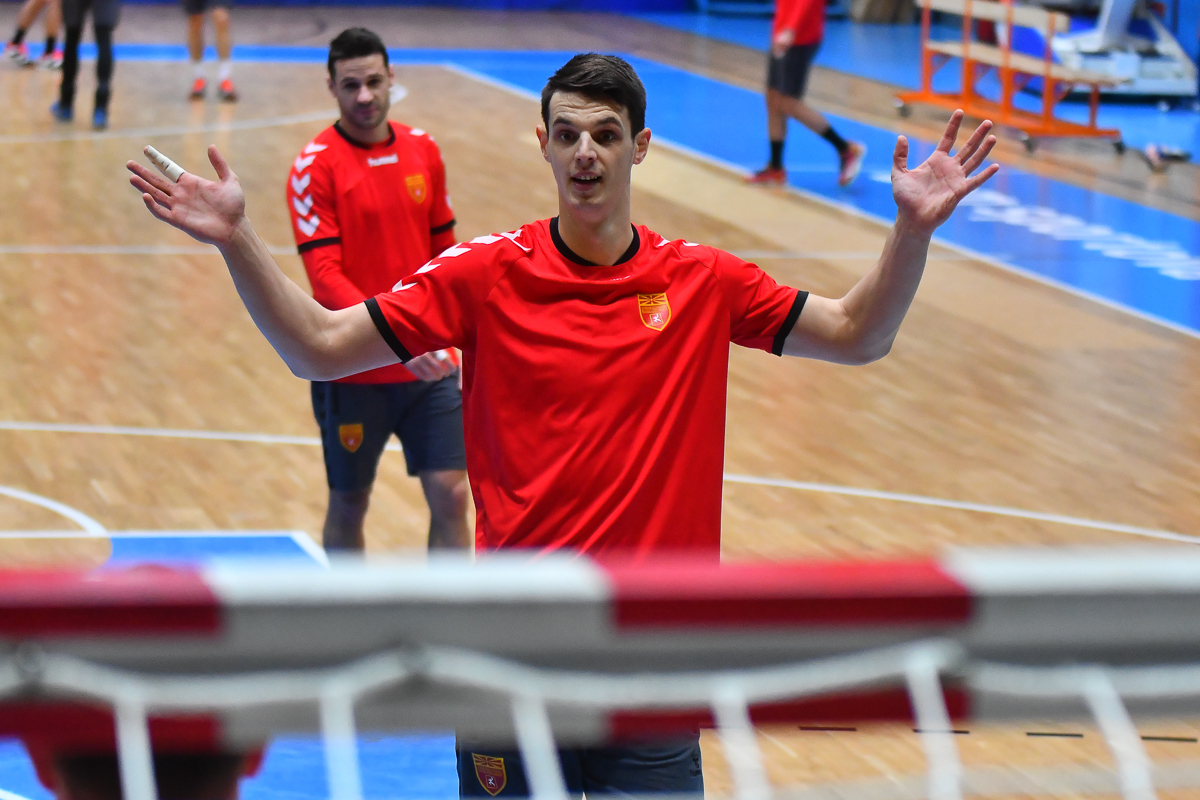

Personal information
- Nationality: Macedonian
- Born: 28 March 1996 (age 30) Kruševo, Macedonia
- Height: 2.02 m (6 ft 8 in)

Sport
- Sport: Handball
- Position: Left back
- Current club: MOL Tatabánya KC
- Number: 28

Youth career
- Years: Team
- 2009–2014: RK Metalurg II

Senior clubs
- Years: Team
- 2014–2017: RK Metalurg Skopje
- 2017–2019: Rhein-Neckar Löwen
- 2019–2020: HBW Balingen-Weilstetten
- 2020–2023: RK Vardar 1961
- 2023–2025: S.L. Benfica
- 2025–10/2025: RK Vardar 1961
- 01/2026–07/2026: MOL Tatabánya KC
- 07/2026–10/2026: GRK Ohrid
- 10/2026–: HSC Suhr Aarau
National team
Years	Team	Apps	(Gls)
2013–	Macedonia	62	(158)
- Updated on 19 July 2023

Filip Taleski (Macedonian: Филип Талески) (born 28 March 1996) is a Macedonian handball player for MOL Tatabánya KC.

He participated at the 2017 World Men's Handball Championship, as well as at the 2017 Men's Junior World Handball Championship.

He has the fastest shot of EHF EURO 2020 with a 141km/h shot in the match against Czech Republic.

He scored a buzzer beater goal in 2022 with Rk Vardar 1961 against Eurofarm Pelister to win the Macedonian Cup title in the last second.

== Honours ==
- Rhein-Neckar Löwen
  - German League: 2016–17
  - German Cup: 2017–18
  - German Super Cup: 2018
- RK Vardar
  - Macedonian League: 2020–21, 2021–22
  - Macedonian Cup: 2020–21, 2021–22, 2022–23
  - SEHA League: Silver: 2019–20
- MOL Tatabánya KC
  - Hungarian Cup: Silver: 2025–26
  - Hungarian League Bronze: 2025–26
  - EHF European Cup Silver: 2025–26

== Individual achievements ==
- Best young player of the year -Macedonia: 2014, 2015
- MVP of Macedonian League: 2022–23
- MVP of Macedonian Cup: 2021–22
