= Abdelrahman Abdou =

Egyptian handball player

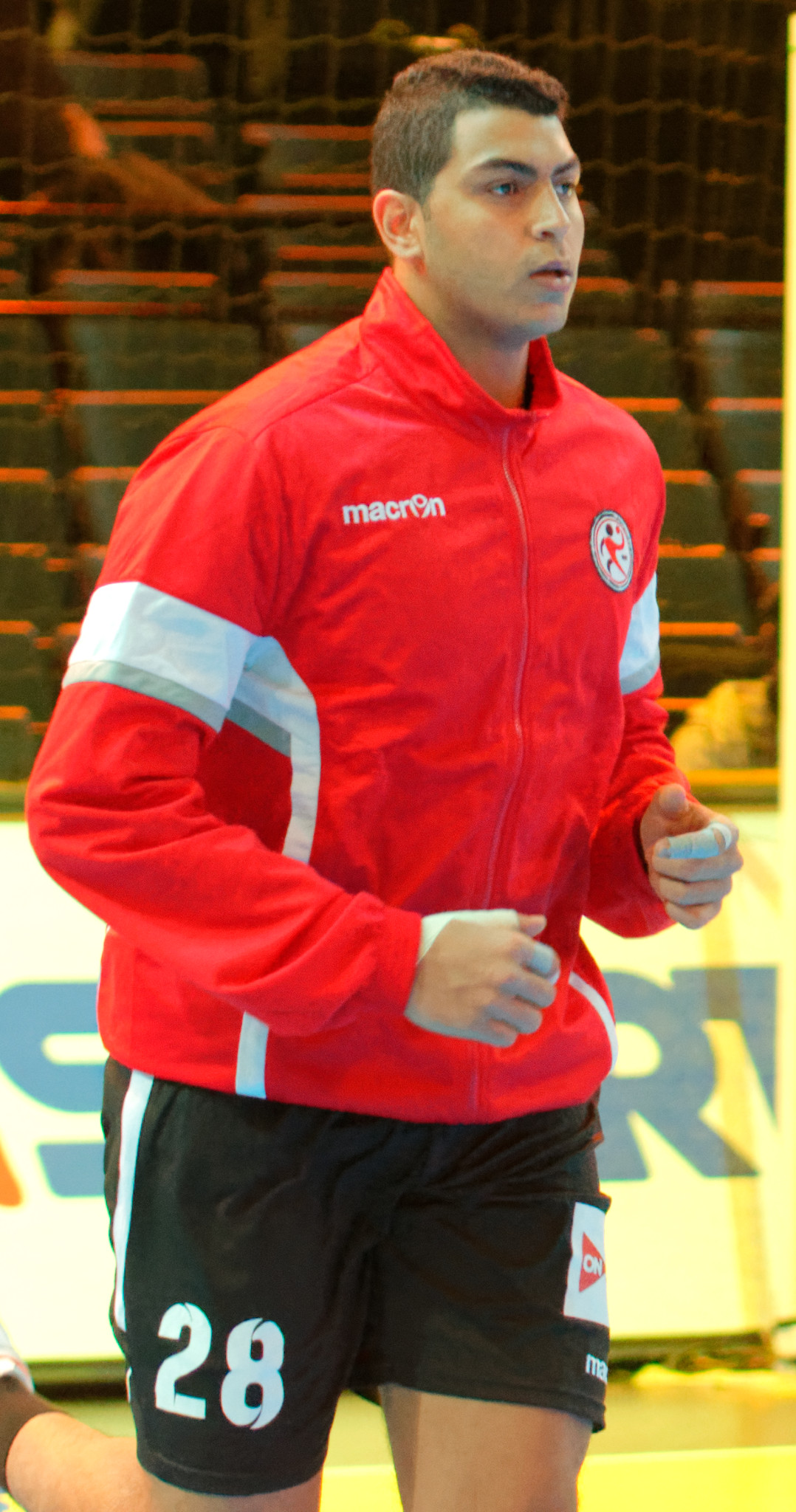
- Abdelrahman Sayed Abdou in 2017

Personal information
- Full name: Abdelrahman Sayed Abdou
- Nationality: Egyptian
- Born: 30 January 1996 (age 30)
- Height: 1.92 m (6 ft 4 in)

Sport
- Sport: Handball
- Position: Left back
- Current club: RK Zagreb
National team
Years	Team	Apps
–	Egypt	54
Medal record
African Championships
Gold medal – first place	2024 Egypt
Mediterranean Games
Silver medal – second place	2022 Oran	Team

Abdelrahman Sayed Abdou (Arabic: عبد الرحمن سيد عبده; born 30 January 1996) is an Egyptian handball player for RK Zagreb and the Egyptian national team.

He participated at the World Men's Handball Championship in 2017, 2019 and 2021.
