= Sebastian Augustinussen =

Danish handball player (born 1996)

Personal information
- Full name: Sebastian Augustinussen
- Nationality: Danish
- Born: 6 May 1996 (age 30) Aarhus, Denmark
- Height: 1.92 m (6 ft 4 in)

Sport
- Sport: Handball
- Position: Right wing
- Current club: SønderjyskE
- Number: 77

Senior clubs
- Years: Team
- 2014-2018: KIF Kolding København
- 2018-2019: Skjern Håndbold
- 2019-2021: HBC Nantes
- 2021-2022: TV Bittenfeld
- 2022-: SønderjyskE
Medal record
Youth World Championship
Silver medal – second place	2013 Hungary

Sebastian Augustinussen (born 6 May 1996) is a Danish handball player who plays for SønderjyskE in the Danish Men's Handball League. He has played several matches for the Danish national junior and youth teams.

In March 2022, he signed a 3-year contract with the Danish club SønderjyskE Håndbold.

He also participated at the 2013 Men's Youth World Handball Championship in Hungary, winning the title.

== Achievements ==
- Danish Handball League:
  - Winner: 2015
  - Third place: 2019
- LNH Division 1:

Runner-up : 2020
