= Skander Zaïdi =

Tunisian handball player (born 1997)

Skander Zaid
Personal information
- Nationality: Tunisian
- Born: 23 April 1997 (age 29) Béni Khiar
- Height: 1.97 m (6 ft 6 in)

Sport
- Sport: Handball
- Position: Left back
- Current club: Al-Najma SC
- Number: 7
National team
Years	Team	Apps	(Gls)
–	Tunisia	7	(1)
Medal record
African Championship
Gold medal – first place	2018 Gabon
Silver medal – second place	2020 Tunisia

Skander Zaïdi (Arabic: إسكندر الزايدي; born 23 April 1997) is a Tunisian handball player for Al-Najma SC and the Tunisian national team.

He participated at the 2017 and 2021 World Men's Handball Championship.
