= José Luis López (handballer) =

Chilean handball player (born 1998)

Personal information
- Full name: José Luis López Rojas
- Born: 17 June 1998 (age 28) Chimbarongo, Chile
- Height: 1.92 m (6 ft 4 in)

Sport
- Sport: Handball
- Position: Pivot

Senior clubs
- Years: Team
- 2015–2017: Unión Machalí
- 2017–2018: Bueu Atlético
- 2018–2021: Unión Machalí
National team
Years	Team	Apps	(Gls)
–	Chile	13	(29)
Medal record
Pan American Championship
Bronze medal – third place	2018 Greenland
South American Games
Bronze medal – third place	2018 Cochabamba	Team
Pan American Junior Championship
Bronze medal – third place	2017 Paraguay
South and Central American Junior Championship
Bronze medal – third place	2019 Colombia
Pan American Youth Championship
Bronze medal – third place	2017 Chile

José Luis López Rojas (born 17 June 1998) is a Chilean handball player who played for Unión Machalí and the Chilean national team.

He participated at the 2017 World Men's Handball Championship.

== Personal life ==
Due to his strong build, he was nicknamed El Tanque de Chimbarongo (The Tank from Chimbarongo).

== Individual awards and achievements ==
- 2017 Pan American Men's Youth Handball Championship:All Star Pivot
