= 2023 IHF Men's U21 Handball World Championship =

- Logo of the championship

Tournament details
- Host countries: Germany; Greece
- Venues: 4 (in 5 host cities)
- Dates: 20 June – 2 July
- Teams: 32 (from 5 confederations)

Final positions
- Champions: Germany (3rd title)
- Runners-up: Hungary
- Third place: Iceland
- Fourth place: Serbia

Tournament statistics
- Matches played: 116
- Goals scored: 6,805 (58.66 per match)
- Top scorers: (Faroe Islands) Elias Ellefsen á Skipagøtu (Japan) Naoki Fujisaka (55 goals)

Awards
- Best player: (Germany) Nils Lichtlein

The 2023 IHF Men's U21 Handball World Championship was the 24th edition of the IHF Men's U21 Handball World Championship, held in Germany and Greece under the aegis of the International Handball Federation (IHF) from 20 June to 2 July 2023. It was the second time in history that the championship will be jointly organised by two countries, the first being in 1979.

Germany won their third title after defeating Hungary in the final.

== Bidding process ==
Two nations entered bid for hosting the tournament:

- Croatia
- Germany

Croatia later withdrew their bid. The tournament was awarded to Germany by IHF Council in its meeting held in Cairo, Egypt on 28 February 2020.

In May/June 2021, the Hellenic Handball Federation approached to German Handball Association with request to co-host the 2023 Men's Junior World Handball Championship due to the cancellation of the 2021 Men's Youth World Handball Championship, which was supposed to be hosted by Greece. On 15 July 2021, the IHF Council unanimously approved the request from Germany and Greece to co-host the event.

== Qualification ==
Event	Host	Dates	Vacancies	Qualified
IHF Council Meeting	(Egypt) Cairo	28 February 2020	2	Germany; Greece
2022 European U-20 Championship	(Portugal) Porto	7–17 July 2022	10	Denmark; Faroe Islands; France; Hungary; Iceland; Portugal; Serbia; Slovenia; Spain; Sweden
2022 Asian Junior Championship	(Bahrain) Isa Town	15–24 July 2022	4	Bahrain; Japan; Kuwait; Saudi Arabia
2022 African Junior Championship	(Rwanda) Kigali	20–27 August 2022	6	Algeria; Angola; Egypt; Libya; Morocco; Tunisia
2022 South and Central American Junior Championship	(Argentina) Buenos Aires	8–12 November 2022	4	Argentina; Brazil; Chile; Costa Rica
2022 IHF Trophy Oceania	(Cook Islands) Rarotonga	5–9 December 2022	~~1~~	~~Australia~~
2022 North America and Caribbean Junior Championship	Mexico City	12–17 December 2022	2	Cuba; United States
European qualification tournament	(Italy) Chieti	6–8 January 2023	2	Croatia; Poland
Reallocation		7 February 2023	1	Norway
2023 IHF Inter-Continental Trophy	(Costa Rica) San José	7–11 March 2023	1	~~Guinea~~
Replacement		28 March 2023	1	Greenland

- Greenland replaced Guinea, who withdrew before the tournament, after Mexico declined the invitation.

== Draw ==
The draw took place on 17 January 2023 in Katowice.

Pot 1	Pot 2	Pot 3	Pot 4
Spain; Portugal; Egypt; Serbia; Sweden; Hungary; Algeria; France	Germany; Denmark; Slovenia; Brazil; Faroe Islands; Greece; Iceland; Poland	Japan; Bahrain; Kuwait; Tunisia; Argentina; Chile; Cuba; Croatia	Norway (Note: Team not determined at time of draw) (Note: After Australia withdrew, Norway was named their replacement.); Angola; Morocco; Libya; Costa Rica; Saudi Arabia; United States; ~~Guinea~~ (Note: Guinea was later replaced by Greenland.)

== Referees ==
The referee pairs were selected on 8 May 2023.

Referees
Algeria	Youcef Belkhiri; Sid Ali Hamidi
Austria	Denis Bolic; Christoph Hurich
Bosnia and Herzegovina	Amar Konjičanin; Dino Konjičanin
Brazil	Daniel Magalhães; Henrique Godoy
Bulgaria	Georgi Doychinov; Yulian Goretsov
China	Xu Xiang; Liu Yu
Croatia	Ante Mikelić; Petar Paradina
Egypt	Hamdy Mahmoud; Mahmoud El-Beltagy

Referees
France	Karim Gasmi; Raouf Gasmi
France	Titouan Picard; Pierre Vauchez
Germany	Christian Hannes; David Hannes
Hungary	Ádám Bíró; Olivér Kiss
Iran	Amir Gheisarian; Ahmad Gheisarian
North Macedonia	Danielo Bozhinovski; Viktor Nachevski
Montenegro	Novica Mitrović; Miljan Vešović

Referees
Norway	Eskil Braseth; Leif André Sundet
Oman	Khamis Al-Wahibi; Omer Al-Shahi
Romania	Cristina Lovin; Simona Stancu
Romania	Mihai Pirvu; Radu Potirniche
Serbia	Marko Sekulić; Vladimir Jovandić
Slovakia	Andrej Budzák; Michal Záhradník
Uruguay	Mathías Sosa; Cristian Lemes

== Preliminary round ==
Times in Germany are UTC+2, in Greece UTC+3.

=== Group A ===
Pos	Team	Pld	W	D	L	GF	GA	GD	Pts	Qualification
1	Croatia	3	2	1	0	105	79	+26	5	Main round
2	France	3	2	0	1	108	77	+31	4	Main round
3	Poland	3	1	1	1	110	89	+21	3	Presidents Cup
4	United States	3	0	0	3	62	140	−78	0	Presidents Cup

Source: IHF
Rules for classification: 1) points; 2) head-to-head points; 3) head-to-head goal difference; 4) head-to-head number of goals scored; 5) goal difference.

20 June 2023; 13:15	Poland	47–22	United States	GETEC Arena, Magdeburg; Attendance: 400; Referees: Mitrović, Vešović (MNE)
20 June 2023; 13:15	Wiaderny 8	(25–11)	Edwards 6	GETEC Arena, Magdeburg; Attendance: 400; Referees: Mitrović, Vešović (MNE)
20 June 2023; 13:15	4× (suspension)	Report	5× (suspension)	GETEC Arena, Magdeburg; Attendance: 400; Referees: Mitrović, Vešović (MNE)

20 June 2023; 19:30	France	26–27	Croatia	GETEC Arena, Magdeburg; Attendance: 600; Referees: Bíró, Kiss (HUN)
20 June 2023; 19:30	Fadhuile 7	(11–13)	Barbić 8	GETEC Arena, Magdeburg; Attendance: 600; Referees: Bíró, Kiss (HUN)
20 June 2023; 19:30	3× (suspension)	Report	1× (yellow card) 4× (suspension)	GETEC Arena, Magdeburg; Attendance: 600; Referees: Bíró, Kiss (HUN)

22 June 2023; 17:15	Poland	30–30	Croatia	GETEC Arena, Magdeburg; Attendance: 450; Referees: Bolic, Hurich (AUT)
22 June 2023; 17:15	Mielczarski 6	(15–13)	Lisac 8	GETEC Arena, Magdeburg; Attendance: 450; Referees: Bolic, Hurich (AUT)
22 June 2023; 17:15	6× (suspension)	Report	1× (yellow card) 6× (suspension)	GETEC Arena, Magdeburg; Attendance: 450; Referees: Bolic, Hurich (AUT)

22 June 2023; 19:30	United States	17–45	France	GETEC Arena, Magdeburg; Attendance: 340; Referees: Bozhinovski, Nachevski (MKD)
22 June 2023; 19:30	Walker 4	(6–24)	Discamps 7	GETEC Arena, Magdeburg; Attendance: 340; Referees: Bozhinovski, Nachevski (MKD)
22 June 2023; 19:30	3× (suspension)	Report		GETEC Arena, Magdeburg; Attendance: 340; Referees: Bozhinovski, Nachevski (MKD)

23 June 2023; 15:30	Croatia	48–23	United States	GETEC Arena, Magdeburg; Attendance: 400; Referees: Al-Wahibi, Al-Shahi (OMA)
23 June 2023; 15:30	Barbić 10	(22–10)	Edwards 5	GETEC Arena, Magdeburg; Attendance: 400; Referees: Al-Wahibi, Al-Shahi (OMA)
23 June 2023; 15:30	3× (suspension)	Report	4× (suspension)	GETEC Arena, Magdeburg; Attendance: 400; Referees: Al-Wahibi, Al-Shahi (OMA)

23 June 2023; 18:00	France	37–33	Poland	GETEC Arena, Magdeburg; Attendance: 700; Referees: Sosa, Lemes (URU)
23 June 2023; 18:00	Fadhuile 8	(20–19)	Nowak 6	GETEC Arena, Magdeburg; Attendance: 700; Referees: Sosa, Lemes (URU)
23 June 2023; 18:00	2× (suspension)	Report	4× (suspension)	GETEC Arena, Magdeburg; Attendance: 700; Referees: Sosa, Lemes (URU)

=== Group B ===
Pos	Team	Pld	W	D	L	GF	GA	GD	Pts	Qualification
1	Germany (H)	3	3	0	0	114	67	+47	6	Main round
2	Tunisia	3	2	0	1	89	90	−1	4	Main round
3	Algeria	3	1	0	2	71	79	−8	2	Presidents Cup
4	Libya	3	0	0	3	55	93	−38	0	Presidents Cup

Source: IHF
Rules for classification: 1) points; 2) head-to-head points; 3) head-to-head goal difference; 4) head-to-head number of goals scored; 5) goal difference.
(H) Hosts

20 June 2023; 13:15	Algeria	22–27	Tunisia	Swiss Life Hall, Hanover; Attendance: 605; Referees: Sekulić, Jovandić (SRB)
20 June 2023; 13:15	Rabah 7	(11–10)	Ben Salem 8	Swiss Life Hall, Hanover; Attendance: 605; Referees: Sekulić, Jovandić (SRB)
20 June 2023; 13:15	3× (suspension)	Report	2× (suspension)	Swiss Life Hall, Hanover; Attendance: 605; Referees: Sekulić, Jovandić (SRB)

20 June 2023; 19:30	Germany	35–14	Libya	Swiss Life Hall, Hanover; Attendance: 3,262; Referees: Lovin, Stancu (ROU)
20 June 2023; 19:30	Freihöfer, Kranzmann 7	(18–4)	Ghareebah 5	Swiss Life Hall, Hanover; Attendance: 3,262; Referees: Lovin, Stancu (ROU)
20 June 2023; 19:30	2× (yellow card) 1× (suspension)	Report	1× (yellow card) 5× (suspension) 1× (red card)	Swiss Life Hall, Hanover; Attendance: 3,262; Referees: Lovin, Stancu (ROU)

21 June 2023; 15:30	Libya	19–27	Algeria	Swiss Life Hall, Hanover; Attendance: 333; Referees: Gheisarian, Gheisarian (IRI)
21 June 2023; 15:30	Abdalla 5	(11–12)	Nidhal, Rabah 5	Swiss Life Hall, Hanover; Attendance: 333; Referees: Gheisarian, Gheisarian (IRI)
21 June 2023; 15:30	2× (suspension) 1× (red card)	Report	5× (suspension)	Swiss Life Hall, Hanover; Attendance: 333; Referees: Gheisarian, Gheisarian (IRI)

21 June 2023; 18:00	Germany	46–31	Tunisia	Swiss Life Hall, Hanover; Attendance: 3,369; Referees: Sosa, Lemes (URU)
21 June 2023; 18:00	Kranzmann 6	(21–13)	Ben Salem 5	Swiss Life Hall, Hanover; Attendance: 3,369; Referees: Sosa, Lemes (URU)
21 June 2023; 18:00	2× (suspension)	Report	1× (yellow card) 5× (suspension)	Swiss Life Hall, Hanover; Attendance: 3,369; Referees: Sosa, Lemes (URU)

23 June 2023; 13:15	Tunisia	31–22	Libya	Swiss Life Hall, Hanover; Attendance: 500; Referees: Mitrović, Vešović (MNE)
23 June 2023; 13:15	Ben Salem 6	(13–11)	Irwayhah 8	Swiss Life Hall, Hanover; Attendance: 500; Referees: Mitrović, Vešović (MNE)
23 June 2023; 13:15	3× (suspension) 1× (red card)	Report	3× (suspension) 1× (red card)	Swiss Life Hall, Hanover; Attendance: 500; Referees: Mitrović, Vešović (MNE)

23 June 2023; 18:00	Algeria	22–33	Germany	Swiss Life Hall, Hanover; Attendance: 3,587; Referees: Braseth, Sundet (NOR)
23 June 2023; 18:00	Nidhal, Rabah 5	(12–16)	Freihöfer 6	Swiss Life Hall, Hanover; Attendance: 3,587; Referees: Braseth, Sundet (NOR)
23 June 2023; 18:00	4× (suspension)	Report		Swiss Life Hall, Hanover; Attendance: 3,587; Referees: Braseth, Sundet (NOR)

=== Group C ===
Pos	Team	Pld	W	D	L	GF	GA	GD	Pts	Qualification
1	Portugal	3	3	0	0	114	61	+53	6	Main round
2	Brazil	3	2	0	1	86	64	+22	4	Main round
3	Kuwait	3	1	0	2	82	92	−10	2	Presidents Cup
4	Costa Rica	3	0	0	3	66	131	−65	0	Presidents Cup

Source: IHF
Rules for classification: 1) points; 2) head-to-head points; 3) head-to-head goal difference; 4) head-to-head number of goals scored; 5) goal difference.

20 June 2023; 11:00	Portugal	35–21	Kuwait	Swiss Life Hall, Hanover; Attendance: 3,120; Referees: Braseth, Sundet (NOR)
20 June 2023; 11:00	three players 5	(18–11)	Al-Haddad, Jaafar 3	Swiss Life Hall, Hanover; Attendance: 3,120; Referees: Braseth, Sundet (NOR)
20 June 2023; 11:00	4× (suspension)	Report	6× (suspension)	Swiss Life Hall, Hanover; Attendance: 3,120; Referees: Braseth, Sundet (NOR)

20 June 2023; 17:15	Brazil	38–17	Costa Rica	Swiss Life Hall, Hanover; Attendance: 3,267; Referees: Gheisarian, Gheisarian (IRI)
20 June 2023; 17:15	Quintino 11	(22–9)	Suárez 4	Swiss Life Hall, Hanover; Attendance: 3,267; Referees: Gheisarian, Gheisarian (IRI)
20 June 2023; 17:15	1× (yellow card) 3× (suspension)	Report	2× (suspension) 1× (red card)	Swiss Life Hall, Hanover; Attendance: 3,267; Referees: Gheisarian, Gheisarian (IRI)

21 June 2023; 13:15	Costa Rica	21–52	Portugal	Swiss Life Hall, Hanover; Attendance: 633; Referees: Lovin, Stancu (ROU)
21 June 2023; 13:15	Suárez 5	(12–26)	P. Oliveira 9	Swiss Life Hall, Hanover; Attendance: 633; Referees: Lovin, Stancu (ROU)
21 June 2023; 13:15		Report	2× (yellow card) 5× (suspension)	Swiss Life Hall, Hanover; Attendance: 633; Referees: Lovin, Stancu (ROU)

21 June 2023; 20:15	Brazil	29–20	Kuwait	Swiss Life Hall, Hanover; Attendance: 3,369; Referees: Sekulić, Jovandić (SRB)
21 June 2023; 20:15	Monta da Silva 9	(12–11)	Jaafar 6	Swiss Life Hall, Hanover; Attendance: 3,369; Referees: Sekulić, Jovandić (SRB)
21 June 2023; 20:15	1× (yellow card) 3× (suspension)	Report	2× (yellow card) 3× (suspension)	Swiss Life Hall, Hanover; Attendance: 3,369; Referees: Sekulić, Jovandić (SRB)

23 June 2023; 15:30	Kuwait	41–28	Costa Rica	Swiss Life Hall, Hanover; Attendance: 600; Referees: Doychinov, Goretsov (BUL)
23 June 2023; 15:30	Al-Motawaa 12	(16–9)	Cubero 6	Swiss Life Hall, Hanover; Attendance: 600; Referees: Doychinov, Goretsov (BUL)
23 June 2023; 15:30	2× (suspension) 1× (red card)	Report	1× (suspension)	Swiss Life Hall, Hanover; Attendance: 600; Referees: Doychinov, Goretsov (BUL)

23 June 2023; 20:15	Portugal	27–19	Brazil	Swiss Life Hall, Hanover; Attendance: 3,267; Referees: Belkhiri, Hamidi (ALG)
23 June 2023; 20:15	Sousa 9	(13–11)	Monta da Silva, Rosa 4	Swiss Life Hall, Hanover; Attendance: 3,267; Referees: Belkhiri, Hamidi (ALG)
23 June 2023; 20:15	1× (suspension)	Report	1× (yellow card) 3× (suspension)	Swiss Life Hall, Hanover; Attendance: 3,267; Referees: Belkhiri, Hamidi (ALG)

=== Group D ===
Pos	Team	Pld	W	D	L	GF	GA	GD	Pts	Qualification
1	Faroe Islands	3	3	0	0	107	86	+21	6	Main round
2	Spain	3	2	0	1	108	90	+18	4	Main round
3	Japan	3	1	0	2	95	114	−19	2	Presidents Cup
4	Angola	3	0	0	3	81	101	−20	0	Presidents Cup

Source: IHF
Rules for classification: 1) points; 2) head-to-head points; 3) head-to-head goal difference; 4) head-to-head number of goals scored; 5) goal difference.

20 June 2023; 11:00	Faroe Islands	34–21	Angola	GETEC Arena, Magdeburg; Attendance: 1,200; Referees: Bozhinovski, Nachevski (MKD)
20 June 2023; 11:00	E. Ellefsen á Skipagøtu 8	(18–8)	José 5	GETEC Arena, Magdeburg; Attendance: 1,200; Referees: Bozhinovski, Nachevski (MKD)
20 June 2023; 11:00	5× (suspension)	Report	4× (suspension)	GETEC Arena, Magdeburg; Attendance: 1,200; Referees: Bozhinovski, Nachevski (MKD)

20 June 2023; 17:15	Spain	43–28	Japan	GETEC Arena, Magdeburg; Attendance: 550; Referees: Bolic, Hurich (AUT)
20 June 2023; 17:15	Soler 9	(22–16)	Fujisaka 10	GETEC Arena, Magdeburg; Attendance: 550; Referees: Bolic, Hurich (AUT)
20 June 2023; 17:15	8× (suspension)	Report	6× (suspension)	GETEC Arena, Magdeburg; Attendance: 550; Referees: Bolic, Hurich (AUT)

22 June 2023; 11:00	Faroe Islands	39–34	Japan	GETEC Arena, Magdeburg; Attendance: 1,100; Referees: Doychinov, Goretsov (BUL)
22 June 2023; 11:00	E. Ellefsen á Skipagøtu, West Av Teigum 11	(21–17)	Fujisaka, Oura 8	GETEC Arena, Magdeburg; Attendance: 1,100; Referees: Doychinov, Goretsov (BUL)
22 June 2023; 11:00	3× (suspension)	Report		GETEC Arena, Magdeburg; Attendance: 1,100; Referees: Doychinov, Goretsov (BUL)

22 June 2023; 13:15	Angola	28–34	Spain	GETEC Arena, Magdeburg; Attendance: 600; Referees: Al-Wahibi, Al-Shahi (OMA)
22 June 2023; 13:15	José 6	(15–17)	Soler 7	GETEC Arena, Magdeburg; Attendance: 600; Referees: Al-Wahibi, Al-Shahi (OMA)
22 June 2023; 13:15	5× (suspension) 1× (red card)	Report	2× (suspension)	GETEC Arena, Magdeburg; Attendance: 600; Referees: Al-Wahibi, Al-Shahi (OMA)

23 June 2023; 13:15	Japan	33–32	Angola	GETEC Arena, Magdeburg; Attendance: 200; Referees: Lovin, Stancu (ROU)
23 June 2023; 13:15	Fujisaka 8	(14–17)	Chicola, João 5	GETEC Arena, Magdeburg; Attendance: 200; Referees: Lovin, Stancu (ROU)
23 June 2023; 13:15	1× (yellow card) 7× (suspension)	Report	5× (suspension) 1× (red card)	GETEC Arena, Magdeburg; Attendance: 200; Referees: Lovin, Stancu (ROU)

23 June 2023; 20:15	Spain	31–34	Faroe Islands	GETEC Arena, Magdeburg; Attendance: 650; Referees: Bíró, Kiss (HUN)
23 June 2023; 20:15	three players 6	(10–21)	Vedelsbøl, West Av Teigum 8	GETEC Arena, Magdeburg; Attendance: 650; Referees: Bíró, Kiss (HUN)
23 June 2023; 20:15	3× (suspension)	Report	4× (suspension)	GETEC Arena, Magdeburg; Attendance: 650; Referees: Bíró, Kiss (HUN)

=== Group E ===
Pos	Team	Pld	W	D	L	GF	GA	GD	Pts	Qualification
1	Hungary	3	3	0	0	94	72	+22	6	Main round
2	Denmark	3	2	0	1	92	83	+9	4	Main round
3	Norway	3	1	0	2	76	95	−19	2	Presidents Cup
4	Argentina	3	0	0	3	81	93	−12	0	Presidents Cup

Source: IHF
Rules for classification: 1) points; 2) head-to-head points; 3) head-to-head goal difference; 4) head-to-head number of goals scored; 5) goal difference.

20 June 2023; 13:15	Hungary	30–22	Argentina	Ano Liosia Olympic Hall, Athens; Referees: Mahmoud, El-Beltagy (EGY)
20 June 2023; 13:15	B. Krakovszki 5	(13–12)	three players 3	Ano Liosia Olympic Hall, Athens; Referees: Mahmoud, El-Beltagy (EGY)
20 June 2023; 13:15	2× (yellow card) 6× (suspension)	Report	1× (yellow card) 3× (suspension)	Ano Liosia Olympic Hall, Athens; Referees: Mahmoud, El-Beltagy (EGY)

20 June 2023; 18:00	Denmark	33–22	Norway	Ano Liosia Olympic Hall, Athens; Referees: Budzák, Záhradník (SVK)
20 June 2023; 18:00	Lykke 6	(16–12)	five players 3	Ano Liosia Olympic Hall, Athens; Referees: Budzák, Záhradník (SVK)
20 June 2023; 18:00	4× (suspension)	Report	1× (yellow card) 6× (suspension)	Ano Liosia Olympic Hall, Athens; Referees: Budzák, Záhradník (SVK)

22 June 2023; 13:15	Norway	22–31	Hungary	Ano Liosia Olympic Hall, Athens; Referees: Picard, Vauchez (FRA)
22 June 2023; 13:15	Knutsen 5	(12–19)	Lukács 6	Ano Liosia Olympic Hall, Athens; Referees: Picard, Vauchez (FRA)
22 June 2023; 13:15	3× (suspension)	Report	5× (suspension)	Ano Liosia Olympic Hall, Athens; Referees: Picard, Vauchez (FRA)

22 June 2023; 18:00	Denmark	31–28	Argentina	Ano Liosia Olympic Hall, Athens; Referees: Xu, Liu (CHN)
22 June 2023; 18:00	T. Arnoldsen 9	(16–12)	Garay 8	Ano Liosia Olympic Hall, Athens; Referees: Xu, Liu (CHN)
22 June 2023; 18:00	4× (suspension)	Report	4× (suspension) 2× (red card)	Ano Liosia Olympic Hall, Athens; Referees: Xu, Liu (CHN)

23 June 2023; 15:30	Argentina	31–32	Norway	Ano Liosia Olympic Hall, Athens; Attendance: 50; Referees: Pirvu, Potirniche (ROU)
23 June 2023; 15:30	Jung 12	(12–18)	Larsen 6	Ano Liosia Olympic Hall, Athens; Attendance: 50; Referees: Pirvu, Potirniche (ROU)
23 June 2023; 15:30	1× (yellow card) 4× (suspension) 2× (red card)	Report	1× (yellow card) 4× (suspension) 1× (red card)	Ano Liosia Olympic Hall, Athens; Attendance: 50; Referees: Pirvu, Potirniche (ROU)

23 June 2023; 20:15	Hungary	33–28	Denmark	Ano Liosia Olympic Hall, Athens; Referees: Konjičanin, Konjičanin (BIH)
23 June 2023; 20:15	Papp 6	(16–15)	T. Arnoldsen 6	Ano Liosia Olympic Hall, Athens; Referees: Konjičanin, Konjičanin (BIH)
23 June 2023; 20:15	8× (suspension)	Report	3× (suspension) 1× (red card)	Ano Liosia Olympic Hall, Athens; Referees: Konjičanin, Konjičanin (BIH)

=== Group F ===
Pos	Team	Pld	W	D	L	GF	GA	GD	Pts	Qualification
1	Sweden	3	3	0	0	123	54	+69	6	Main round
2	Bahrain	3	1	1	1	109	77	+32	3 (Note: Slovenia 29–29 Bahrain)	Main round
3	Slovenia	3	1	1	1	102	90	+12	3	Presidents Cup
4	Greenland (Note: Greenland replaced Guinea.)	3	0	0	3	48	161	−113	0	Presidents Cup

Source: IHF
Rules for classification: 1) points; 2) head-to-head points; 3) head-to-head goal difference; 4) head-to-head number of goals scored; 5) goal difference.
Notes:

20 June 2023; 11:00	Slovenia	48–23	Greenland	Ano Liosia Olympic Hall, Athens; Referees: Xu, Liu (CHN)
20 June 2023; 11:00	Miklavec 9	(24–10)	Rosing 6	Ano Liosia Olympic Hall, Athens; Referees: Xu, Liu (CHN)
20 June 2023; 11:00	7× (suspension) 1× (red card)	Report	3× (suspension) 1× (red card)	Ano Liosia Olympic Hall, Athens; Referees: Xu, Liu (CHN)

20 June 2023; 15:45	Sweden	35–17	Bahrain	Ano Liosia Olympic Hall, Athens; Referees: Magalhães, Godoy (BRA)
20 June 2023; 15:45	four players 5	(21–11)	Rabia 7	Ano Liosia Olympic Hall, Athens; Referees: Magalhães, Godoy (BRA)
20 June 2023; 15:45	1× (yellow card) 6× (suspension)	Report	4× (suspension)	Ano Liosia Olympic Hall, Athens; Referees: Magalhães, Godoy (BRA)

22 June 2023; 11:00	Slovenia	29–29	Bahrain	Ano Liosia Olympic Hall, Athens; Referees: Pirvu, Potirniche (ROU)
22 June 2023; 11:00	Janc, Mlivić 7	(12–12)	Khamis, Rabia 7	Ano Liosia Olympic Hall, Athens; Referees: Pirvu, Potirniche (ROU)
22 June 2023; 11:00	1× (yellow card) 8× (suspension)	Report	1× (yellow card) 6× (suspension) 1× (red card)	Ano Liosia Olympic Hall, Athens; Referees: Pirvu, Potirniche (ROU)

22 June 2023; 15:45	Greenland	12–50	Sweden	Ano Liosia Olympic Hall, Athens; Referees: Mahmoud, El-Beltagy (EGY)
22 June 2023; 15:45	Fleischer 3	(5–24)	Palmar 8	Ano Liosia Olympic Hall, Athens; Referees: Mahmoud, El-Beltagy (EGY)
22 June 2023; 15:45	3× (suspension)	Report	1× (yellow card) 1× (suspension)	Ano Liosia Olympic Hall, Athens; Referees: Mahmoud, El-Beltagy (EGY)

23 June 2023; 13:15	Bahrain	63–13	Greenland	Ano Liosia Olympic Hall, Athens; Referees: Picard, Vauchez (FRA)
23 June 2023; 13:15	Khamis 15	(33–5)	Lennert 4	Ano Liosia Olympic Hall, Athens; Referees: Picard, Vauchez (FRA)
23 June 2023; 13:15	1× (suspension)	Report	1× (yellow card) 13× (suspension) 3× (red card)	Ano Liosia Olympic Hall, Athens; Referees: Picard, Vauchez (FRA)

23 June 2023; 18:00	Sweden	38–25	Slovenia	Ano Liosia Olympic Hall, Athens; Referees: Hannes, Hannes (GER)
23 June 2023; 18:00	Ljungmark, Palmar 8	(20–13)	Rot 5	Ano Liosia Olympic Hall, Athens; Referees: Hannes, Hannes (GER)
23 June 2023; 18:00	2× (suspension)	Report	2× (yellow card) 10× (suspension) 1× (red card)	Ano Liosia Olympic Hall, Athens; Referees: Hannes, Hannes (GER)

=== Group G ===
Pos	Team	Pld	W	D	L	GF	GA	GD	Pts	Qualification
1	Iceland	3	3	0	0	84	62	+22	6	Main round
2	Serbia	3	2	0	1	108	65	+43	4	Main round
3	Morocco	3	1	0	2	59	73	−14	2	Presidents Cup
4	Chile	3	0	0	3	49	100	−51	0	Presidents Cup

Source: IHF
Rules for classification: 1) points; 2) head-to-head points; 3) head-to-head goal difference; 4) head-to-head number of goals scored; 5) goal difference.

20 June 2023; 11:00	Iceland	17–15	Morocco	Melina Merkouri Indoor Hall, Athens; Attendance: 75; Referees: Pirvu, Potirniche (ROU)
20 June 2023; 11:00	Gunnarsson 4	(7–5)	Boukhamsa, Ouzrour 3	Melina Merkouri Indoor Hall, Athens; Attendance: 75; Referees: Pirvu, Potirniche (ROU)
20 June 2023; 11:00	1× (yellow card) 4× (suspension) 1× (red card)	Report	5× (suspension)	Melina Merkouri Indoor Hall, Athens; Attendance: 75; Referees: Pirvu, Potirniche (ROU)

20 June 2023; 15:45	Serbia	41–13	Chile	Melina Merkouri Indoor Hall, Athens; Referees: Picard, Vauchez (FRA)
20 June 2023; 15:45	Papović 6	(19–7)	Scaramelli 3	Melina Merkouri Indoor Hall, Athens; Referees: Picard, Vauchez (FRA)
20 June 2023; 15:45	3× (suspension)	Report	3× (suspension)	Melina Merkouri Indoor Hall, Athens; Referees: Picard, Vauchez (FRA)

21 June 2023; 13:15	Iceland	35–18	Chile	Melina Merkouri Indoor Hall, Athens; Referees: Mikelić, Paradina (CRO)
21 June 2023; 13:15	Finnson 7	(12–6)	Scaramelli 6	Melina Merkouri Indoor Hall, Athens; Referees: Mikelić, Paradina (CRO)
21 June 2023; 13:15	4× (suspension)	Report	1× (yellow card) 4× (suspension)	Melina Merkouri Indoor Hall, Athens; Referees: Mikelić, Paradina (CRO)

21 June 2023; 20:15	Morocco	20–38	Serbia	Melina Merkouri Indoor Hall, Athens; Attendance: 50; Referees: Hannes, Hannes (GER)
21 June 2023; 20:15	Boukhamsa 5	(10–23)	Kos 6	Melina Merkouri Indoor Hall, Athens; Attendance: 50; Referees: Hannes, Hannes (GER)
21 June 2023; 20:15	5× (suspension)	Report	2× (suspension)	Melina Merkouri Indoor Hall, Athens; Attendance: 50; Referees: Hannes, Hannes (GER)

23 June 2023; 13:15	Chile	18–24	Morocco	Melina Merkouri Indoor Hall, Athens; Attendance: 50; Referees: Magalhães, Godoy (BRA)
23 June 2023; 13:15	Scaramelli 7	(9–13)	Eladich, Razgui 5	Melina Merkouri Indoor Hall, Athens; Attendance: 50; Referees: Magalhães, Godoy (BRA)
23 June 2023; 13:15	3× (suspension)	Report	3× (suspension)	Melina Merkouri Indoor Hall, Athens; Attendance: 50; Referees: Magalhães, Godoy (BRA)

23 June 2023; 20:15	Serbia	29–32	Iceland	Melina Merkouri Indoor Hall, Athens; Referees: Gasmi, Gasmi (FRA)
23 June 2023; 20:15	Kos 9	(14–16)	Guðjónsson 8	Melina Merkouri Indoor Hall, Athens; Referees: Gasmi, Gasmi (FRA)
23 June 2023; 20:15	1× (yellow card) 3× (suspension) 2× (red card)	Report	1× (yellow card) 4× (suspension)	Melina Merkouri Indoor Hall, Athens; Referees: Gasmi, Gasmi (FRA)

=== Group H ===
Pos	Team	Pld	W	D	L	GF	GA	GD	Pts	Qualification
1	Egypt	3	3	0	0	123	92	+31	6	Main round
2	Greece (H)	3	2	0	1	103	84	+19	4	Main round
3	Saudi Arabia	3	1	0	2	84	100	−16	2	Presidents Cup
4	Cuba	3	0	0	3	81	115	−34	0	Presidents Cup

Source: IHF
Rules for classification: 1) points; 2) head-to-head points; 3) head-to-head goal difference; 4) head-to-head number of goals scored; 5) goal difference.
(H) Hosts

20 June 2023; 13:15	Egypt	45–28	Cuba	Melina Merkouri Indoor Hall, Athens; Referees: Gasmi, Gasmi (FRA)
20 June 2023; 13:15	Ibrahim 7	(20–14)	Vazques 11	Melina Merkouri Indoor Hall, Athens; Referees: Gasmi, Gasmi (FRA)
20 June 2023; 13:15	2× (suspension)	Report	4× (suspension) 1× (red card)	Melina Merkouri Indoor Hall, Athens; Referees: Gasmi, Gasmi (FRA)

20 June 2023; 18:00	Greece	31–22	Saudi Arabia	Melina Merkouri Indoor Hall, Athens; Referees: Hannes, Hannes (GER)
20 June 2023; 18:00	five players 4	(15–10)	Furaij 5	Melina Merkouri Indoor Hall, Athens; Referees: Hannes, Hannes (GER)
20 June 2023; 18:00	7× (suspension)	Report	8× (suspension)	Melina Merkouri Indoor Hall, Athens; Referees: Hannes, Hannes (GER)

21 June 2023; 15:30	Saudi Arabia	34–42	Egypt	Melina Merkouri Indoor Hall, Athens; Referees: Magalhães, Godoy (BRA)
21 June 2023; 15:30	Al-Khedhrawi 10	(20–21)	O. Mohamed 11	Melina Merkouri Indoor Hall, Athens; Referees: Magalhães, Godoy (BRA)
21 June 2023; 15:30	4× (suspension)	Report	2× (yellow card) 4× (suspension)	Melina Merkouri Indoor Hall, Athens; Referees: Magalhães, Godoy (BRA)

21 June 2023; 18:00	Greece	42–26	Cuba	Melina Merkouri Indoor Hall, Athens; Attendance: 580; Referees: Konjičanin, Konjičanin (BIH)
21 June 2023; 18:00	Vasileiou 8	(22–10)	Vazques 7	Melina Merkouri Indoor Hall, Athens; Attendance: 580; Referees: Konjičanin, Konjičanin (BIH)
21 June 2023; 18:00	4× (suspension)	Report	5× (suspension) 1× (red card)	Melina Merkouri Indoor Hall, Athens; Attendance: 580; Referees: Konjičanin, Konjičanin (BIH)

23 June 2023; 15:30	Cuba	27–28	Saudi Arabia	Melina Merkouri Indoor Hall, Athens; Referees: Mikelić, Paradina (CRO)
23 June 2023; 15:30	Gonzales 5	(10–16)	Al-Khedhrawi 9	Melina Merkouri Indoor Hall, Athens; Referees: Mikelić, Paradina (CRO)
23 June 2023; 15:30	1× (yellow card) 6× (suspension) 1× (red card)	Report	3× (suspension)	Melina Merkouri Indoor Hall, Athens; Referees: Mikelić, Paradina (CRO)

23 June 2023; 18:00	Egypt	36–30	Greece	Melina Merkouri Indoor Hall, Athens; Referees: Budzák, Záhradník (SVK)
23 June 2023; 18:00	Abdelhak, O. Mohamed 7	(17–20)	Toskas 8	Melina Merkouri Indoor Hall, Athens; Referees: Budzák, Záhradník (SVK)
23 June 2023; 18:00	5× (suspension)	Report	1× (yellow card) 7× (suspension)	Melina Merkouri Indoor Hall, Athens; Referees: Budzák, Záhradník (SVK)

== President's Cup ==
Points obtained in the matches against the team from the group are taken over.

=== Group I ===
Pos	Team	Pld	W	D	L	GF	GA	GD	Pts	Qualification
1	Poland	3	3	0	0	120	62	+58	6	17–24th places
2	Algeria	3	1	1	1	73	78	−5	3	17–24th places
3	United States	3	1	1	1	70	94	−24	3	25th–32nd places
4	Libya	3	0	0	3	60	89	−29	0	25th–32nd places

Source: IHF
Rules for classification: 1) points; 2) head-to-head points; 3) head-to-head goal difference; 4) head-to-head number of goals scored; 5) goal difference.

25 June 2023; 13:30	Poland	37–17	Libya	GETEC Arena, Magdeburg; Attendance: 845; Referees: Bozhinovski, Nachevski (MKD)
25 June 2023; 13:30	Kosznik 7	(21–7)	Al-Shuwayhidi 4	GETEC Arena, Magdeburg; Attendance: 845; Referees: Bozhinovski, Nachevski (MKD)
25 June 2023; 13:30	1× (suspension)	Report	4× (suspension)	GETEC Arena, Magdeburg; Attendance: 845; Referees: Bozhinovski, Nachevski (MKD)

25 June 2023; 15:45	Algeria	23–23	United States	GETEC Arena, Magdeburg; Attendance: 845; Referees: Gheisarian, Gheisarian (IRI)
25 June 2023; 15:45	Abdelhafid, Nidhal 5	(10–9)	Edwards 5	GETEC Arena, Magdeburg; Attendance: 845; Referees: Gheisarian, Gheisarian (IRI)
25 June 2023; 15:45	5× (suspension)	Report	3× (suspension)	GETEC Arena, Magdeburg; Attendance: 845; Referees: Gheisarian, Gheisarian (IRI)

26 June 2023; 11:00	Poland	36–23	Algeria	GETEC Arena, Magdeburg; Attendance: 1,406; Referees: Sekulić, Jovandić (SRB)
26 June 2023; 11:00	Kosznik 8	(16–11)	Ramy 7	GETEC Arena, Magdeburg; Attendance: 1,406; Referees: Sekulić, Jovandić (SRB)
26 June 2023; 11:00	4× (suspension)	Report	4× (suspension)	GETEC Arena, Magdeburg; Attendance: 1,406; Referees: Sekulić, Jovandić (SRB)

26 June 2023; 13:15	United States	25–24	Libya	GETEC Arena, Magdeburg; Attendance: 400; Referees: Sosa, Lemes (URU)
26 June 2023; 13:15	four players 4	(14–10)	Hireebish 13	GETEC Arena, Magdeburg; Attendance: 400; Referees: Sosa, Lemes (URU)
26 June 2023; 13:15	7× (suspension)	Report	5× (suspension)	GETEC Arena, Magdeburg; Attendance: 400; Referees: Sosa, Lemes (URU)

=== Group II ===
Pos	Team	Pld	W	D	L	GF	GA	GD	Pts	Qualification
1	Japan	3	3	0	0	111	77	+34	6	17–24th places
2	Kuwait	3	2	0	1	102	91	+11	4	17–24th places
3	Angola	3	1	0	2	101	98	+3	2	25th–32nd places
4	Costa Rica	3	0	0	3	77	125	−48	0	25th–32nd places

Source: IHF
Rules for classification: 1) points; 2) head-to-head points; 3) head-to-head goal difference; 4) head-to-head number of goals scored; 5) goal difference.

25 June 2023; 11:00	Kuwait	38–26	Angola	Swiss Life Hall, Hanover; Attendance: 778; Referees: Bolic, Hurich (AUT)
25 June 2023; 11:00	Jaafar 11	(23–15)	José 7	Swiss Life Hall, Hanover; Attendance: 778; Referees: Bolic, Hurich (AUT)
25 June 2023; 11:00	1× (yellow card) 2× (suspension)	Report	1× (yellow card) 2× (suspension)	Swiss Life Hall, Hanover; Attendance: 778; Referees: Bolic, Hurich (AUT)

25 June 2023; 13:15	Japan	41–22	Costa Rica	Swiss Life Hall, Hanover; Attendance: 778; Referees: Al-Wahibi, Al-Shahi (OMA)
25 June 2023; 13:15	Arase 6	(21–10)	Trujillo 5	Swiss Life Hall, Hanover; Attendance: 778; Referees: Al-Wahibi, Al-Shahi (OMA)
25 June 2023; 13:15	3× (suspension)	Report	4× (suspension)	Swiss Life Hall, Hanover; Attendance: 778; Referees: Al-Wahibi, Al-Shahi (OMA)

26 June 2023; 11:00	Kuwait	23–37	Japan	Swiss Life Hall, Hanover; Attendance: 3,117; Referees: Doychinov, Goretsov (BUL)
26 June 2023; 11:00	Al-Dawani 9	(16–19)	Otake, Takahashi 8	Swiss Life Hall, Hanover; Attendance: 3,117; Referees: Doychinov, Goretsov (BUL)
26 June 2023; 11:00	1× (yellow card) 3× (suspension)	Report	2× (suspension)	Swiss Life Hall, Hanover; Attendance: 3,117; Referees: Doychinov, Goretsov (BUL)

26 June 2023; 13:15	Costa Rica	27–43	Angola	Swiss Life Hall, Hanover; Attendance: 200; Referees: Belkhiri, Hamidi (ALG)
26 June 2023; 13:15	Suárez 7	(12–19)	Sebastiao 13	Swiss Life Hall, Hanover; Attendance: 200; Referees: Belkhiri, Hamidi (ALG)
26 June 2023; 13:15	1× (yellow card) 3× (suspension)	Report	1× (yellow card) 4× (suspension)	Swiss Life Hall, Hanover; Attendance: 200; Referees: Belkhiri, Hamidi (ALG)

=== Group III ===
Pos	Team	Pld	W	D	L	GF	GA	GD	Pts	Qualification
1	Norway	3	3	0	0	115	77	+38	6	17–24th places
2	Slovenia	3	2	0	1	103	88	+15	4	17–24th places
3	Argentina	3	1	0	2	103	83	+20	2	25th–32nd places
4	Greenland	3	0	0	3	65	138	−73	0	25th–32nd places

Source: IHF
Rules for classification: 1) points; 2) head-to-head points; 3) head-to-head goal difference; 4) head-to-head number of goals scored; 5) goal difference.

25 June 2023; 12:45	Norway	47–21	Greenland	Ano Liosia Olympic Hall, Athens; Referees: Mahmoud, El-Beltagy (EGY)
25 June 2023; 12:45	Johnsen 8	(24–10)	Nielsen 7	Ano Liosia Olympic Hall, Athens; Referees: Mahmoud, El-Beltagy (EGY)
25 June 2023; 12:45	1× (yellow card) 4× (suspension) 1× (red card)	Report	2× (suspension)	Ano Liosia Olympic Hall, Athens; Referees: Mahmoud, El-Beltagy (EGY)

25 June 2023; 15:00	Slovenia	30–29	Argentina	Ano Liosia Olympic Hall, Athens; Referees: Picard, Vauchez (FRA)
25 June 2023; 15:00	Miklavec 8	(15–15)	Garay 6	Ano Liosia Olympic Hall, Athens; Referees: Picard, Vauchez (FRA)
25 June 2023; 15:00	7× (suspension) 1× (red card)	Report	1× (yellow card) 7× (suspension) 2× (red card) 1×	Ano Liosia Olympic Hall, Athens; Referees: Picard, Vauchez (FRA)

26 June 2023; 12:45	Norway	36–25	Slovenia	Ano Liosia Olympic Hall, Athens; Attendance: 100; Referees: Magalhães, Godoy (BRA)
26 June 2023; 12:45	Knutsen 7	(20–12)	Miklavec 5	Ano Liosia Olympic Hall, Athens; Attendance: 100; Referees: Magalhães, Godoy (BRA)
26 June 2023; 12:45	1× (yellow card) 4× (suspension)	Report	4× (suspension)	Ano Liosia Olympic Hall, Athens; Attendance: 100; Referees: Magalhães, Godoy (BRA)

26 June 2023; 15:00	Argentina	43–21	Greenland	Ano Liosia Olympic Hall, Athens; Attendance: 30; Referees: Budzák, Záhradník (SVK)
26 June 2023; 15:00	Jung 16	(21–13)	Malig. Rosing, Malik Rosing 5	Ano Liosia Olympic Hall, Athens; Attendance: 30; Referees: Budzák, Záhradník (SVK)
26 June 2023; 15:00	6× (suspension)	Report	1× (yellow card) 5× (suspension)	Ano Liosia Olympic Hall, Athens; Attendance: 30; Referees: Budzák, Záhradník (SVK)

=== Group IV ===
Pos	Team	Pld	W	D	L	GF	GA	GD	Pts	Qualification
1	Morocco	3	2	1	0	81	63	+18	5	17–24th places
2	Saudi Arabia	3	2	0	1	68	78	−10	4	17–24th places
3	Cuba	3	0	2	1	76	77	−1	2	25th–32nd places
4	Chile	3	0	1	2	61	68	−7	1	25th–32nd places

Source: IHF
Rules for classification: 1) points; 2) head-to-head points; 3) head-to-head goal difference; 4) head-to-head number of goals scored; 5) goal difference.

25 June 2023; 12:45	Morocco	24–24	Cuba	Melina Merkouri Indoor Hall, Athens; Attendance: 50; Referees: Mikelić, Paradina (CRO)
25 June 2023; 12:45	Kissar 6	(13–13)	Gonzales 6	Melina Merkouri Indoor Hall, Athens; Attendance: 50; Referees: Mikelić, Paradina (CRO)
25 June 2023; 12:45		Report	1× (yellow card) 3× (suspension)	Melina Merkouri Indoor Hall, Athens; Attendance: 50; Referees: Mikelić, Paradina (CRO)

25 June 2023; 15:00	Saudi Arabia	19–18	Chile	Melina Merkouri Indoor Hall, Athens; Attendance: 50; Referees: Xu, Liu (CHN)
25 June 2023; 15:00	Al-Turki 5	(10–9)	Scaramelli 5	Melina Merkouri Indoor Hall, Athens; Attendance: 50; Referees: Xu, Liu (CHN)
25 June 2023; 15:00	2× (suspension)	Report	1× (yellow card) 3× (suspension)	Melina Merkouri Indoor Hall, Athens; Attendance: 50; Referees: Xu, Liu (CHN)

26 June 2023; 12:45	Morocco	33–21	Saudi Arabia	Melina Merkouri Indoor Hall, Athens; Attendance: 50; Referees: Pirvu, Potirniche (ROU)
26 June 2023; 12:45	Eladich 7	(15–14)	Al-Abdullah 5	Melina Merkouri Indoor Hall, Athens; Attendance: 50; Referees: Pirvu, Potirniche (ROU)
26 June 2023; 12:45	1× (yellow card) 4× (suspension) 1× (red card)	Report	1× (yellow card) 1× (suspension)	Melina Merkouri Indoor Hall, Athens; Attendance: 50; Referees: Pirvu, Potirniche (ROU)

26 June 2023; 15:00	Chile	25–25	Cuba	Melina Merkouri Indoor Hall, Athens; Attendance: 58; Referees: Mahmoud, El-Beltagy (EGY)
26 June 2023; 15:00	Oyarzún 7	(13–11)	Vazques 9	Melina Merkouri Indoor Hall, Athens; Attendance: 58; Referees: Mahmoud, El-Beltagy (EGY)
26 June 2023; 15:00	1× (suspension)	Report	5× (suspension)	Melina Merkouri Indoor Hall, Athens; Attendance: 58; Referees: Mahmoud, El-Beltagy (EGY)

== Main round ==
Points obtained in the matches against the team from the group are taken over.

=== Group I ===
Pos	Team	Pld	W	D	L	GF	GA	GD	Pts	Qualification
1	Germany (H)	3	3	0	0	107	89	+18	6	Quarterfinals
2	Croatia	3	2	0	1	92	80	+12	4	Quarterfinals
3	France	3	1	0	2	97	88	+9	2	9–16th places
4	Tunisia	3	0	0	3	85	124	−39	0	9–16th places

Source: IHF
Rules for classification: 1) points; 2) head-to-head points; 3) head-to-head goal difference; 4) head-to-head number of goals scored; 5) goal difference.
(H) Hosts

25 June 2023; 18:15	Croatia	36–23	Tunisia	GETEC Arena, Magdeburg; Attendance: 1,700; Referees: Sosa, Lemes (URU)
25 June 2023; 18:15	Car 7	(13–6)	three players 5	GETEC Arena, Magdeburg; Attendance: 1,700; Referees: Sosa, Lemes (URU)
25 June 2023; 18:15	2× (suspension)	Report	4× (suspension)	GETEC Arena, Magdeburg; Attendance: 1,700; Referees: Sosa, Lemes (URU)

25 June 2023; 20:30	Germany	30–29	France	GETEC Arena, Magdeburg; Attendance: 3,100; Referees: Sekulić, Jovandić (SRB)
25 June 2023; 20:30	Fischer, Sauter 5	(17–16)	Vescovo, Vincent 6	GETEC Arena, Magdeburg; Attendance: 3,100; Referees: Sekulić, Jovandić (SRB)
25 June 2023; 20:30	3× (suspension)	Report	1× (yellow card) 5× (suspension)	GETEC Arena, Magdeburg; Attendance: 3,100; Referees: Sekulić, Jovandić (SRB)

26 June 2023; 18:15	France	42–31	Tunisia	GETEC Arena, Magdeburg; Attendance: 2,345; Referees: Lovin, Stancu (ROU)
26 June 2023; 18:15	Fadhuile, Mantz 6	(19–13)	Ben Fraj 6	GETEC Arena, Magdeburg; Attendance: 2,345; Referees: Lovin, Stancu (ROU)
26 June 2023; 18:15	1× (yellow card) 5× (suspension)	Report	1× (yellow card) 3× (suspension) 1× (red card)	GETEC Arena, Magdeburg; Attendance: 2,345; Referees: Lovin, Stancu (ROU)

26 June 2023; 20:30	Croatia	29–31	Germany	GETEC Arena, Magdeburg; Attendance: 2,345; Referees: Braseth, Sundet (NOR)
26 June 2023; 20:30	Barbić 6	(12–15)	Freihöfer 7	GETEC Arena, Magdeburg; Attendance: 2,345; Referees: Braseth, Sundet (NOR)
26 June 2023; 20:30	1× (yellow card) 3× (suspension)	Report		GETEC Arena, Magdeburg; Attendance: 2,345; Referees: Braseth, Sundet (NOR)

=== Group II ===
Pos	Team	Pld	W	D	L	GF	GA	GD	Pts	Qualification
1	Faroe Islands	3	3	0	0	94	77	+17	6	Quarterfinals
2	Portugal	3	2	0	1	79	77	+2	4	Quarterfinals
3	Spain	3	1	0	2	98	89	+9	2	9–16th places
4	Brazil	3	0	0	3	68	96	−28	0	9–16th places

Source: IHF
Rules for classification: 1) points; 2) head-to-head points; 3) head-to-head goal difference; 4) head-to-head number of goals scored; 5) goal difference.

25 June 2023; 15:45	Portugal	33–31	Spain	Swiss Life Hall, Hanover; Attendance: 1,180; Referees: Belkhiri, Hamidi (ALG)
25 June 2023; 15:45	Oliveira 7	(19–20)	Gurri Aregay 8	Swiss Life Hall, Hanover; Attendance: 1,180; Referees: Belkhiri, Hamidi (ALG)
25 June 2023; 15:45	1× (yellow card) 4× (suspension)	Report	3× (suspension) 1× (red card)	Swiss Life Hall, Hanover; Attendance: 1,180; Referees: Belkhiri, Hamidi (ALG)

25 June 2023; 18:00	Faroe Islands	33–27	Brazil	Swiss Life Hall, Hanover; Attendance: 1,180; Referees: Doychinov, Goretsov (BUL)
25 June 2023; 18:00	E. Ellefsen á Skipagøtu 13	(16–13)	Monta da Silva 7	Swiss Life Hall, Hanover; Attendance: 1,180; Referees: Doychinov, Goretsov (BUL)
25 June 2023; 18:00	1× (suspension)	Report	1× (yellow card) 1× (suspension)	Swiss Life Hall, Hanover; Attendance: 1,180; Referees: Doychinov, Goretsov (BUL)

26 June 2023; 15:45	Portugal	19–27	Faroe Islands	Swiss Life Hall, Hanover; Attendance: 638; Referees: Bíró, Kiss (HUN)
26 June 2023; 15:45	Sousa 4	(10–15)	Hansen, Í Selvindi 8	Swiss Life Hall, Hanover; Attendance: 638; Referees: Bíró, Kiss (HUN)
26 June 2023; 15:45	2× (yellow card) 2× (suspension)	Report	1× (suspension)	Swiss Life Hall, Hanover; Attendance: 638; Referees: Bíró, Kiss (HUN)

26 June 2023; 18:00	Brazil	22–36	Spain	Swiss Life Hall, Hanover; Attendance: 638; Referees: Mitrović, Vešović (MNE)
26 June 2023; 18:00	Morais 4	(8–16)	Álvarez 7	Swiss Life Hall, Hanover; Attendance: 638; Referees: Mitrović, Vešović (MNE)
26 June 2023; 18:00	1× (yellow card) 3× (suspension)	Report	2× (suspension)	Swiss Life Hall, Hanover; Attendance: 638; Referees: Mitrović, Vešović (MNE)

=== Group III ===
Pos	Team	Pld	W	D	L	GF	GA	GD	Pts	Qualification
1	Hungary	3	3	0	0	89	75	+14	6	Quarterfinals
2	Denmark	3	2	0	1	85	81	+4	4	Quarterfinals
3	Sweden	3	1	0	2	87	75	+12	2	9–16th places
4	Bahrain	3	0	0	3	60	90	−30	0	9–16th places

Source: IHF
Rules for classification: 1) points; 2) head-to-head points; 3) head-to-head goal difference; 4) head-to-head number of goals scored; 5) goal difference.

25 June 2023; 17:30	Hungary	27–21	Bahrain	Ano Liosia Olympic Hall, Athens; Referees: Magalhães, Godoy (BRA)
25 June 2023; 17:30	Imre 9	(14–12)	Khamis 6	Ano Liosia Olympic Hall, Athens; Referees: Magalhães, Godoy (BRA)
25 June 2023; 17:30	6× (suspension)	Report	1× (yellow card) 4× (suspension) 1× (red card)	Ano Liosia Olympic Hall, Athens; Referees: Magalhães, Godoy (BRA)

25 June 2023; 19:45	Sweden	26–29	Denmark	Ano Liosia Olympic Hall, Athens; Referees: Budzák, Záhradník (SVK)
25 June 2023; 19:45	Möller 7	(15–14)	T. Arnoldsen, Lykke 6	Ano Liosia Olympic Hall, Athens; Referees: Budzák, Záhradník (SVK)
25 June 2023; 19:45	5× (suspension)	Report	1× (yellow card) 4× (suspension)	Ano Liosia Olympic Hall, Athens; Referees: Budzák, Záhradník (SVK)

26 June 2023; 17:30	Hungary	29–26	Sweden	Ano Liosia Olympic Hall, Athens; Attendance: 100; Referees: Konjičanin, Konjičanin (BIH)
26 June 2023; 17:30	Imre 11	(16–13)	Palmar 8	Ano Liosia Olympic Hall, Athens; Attendance: 100; Referees: Konjičanin, Konjičanin (BIH)
26 June 2023; 17:30	4× (suspension)	Report	2× (suspension)	Ano Liosia Olympic Hall, Athens; Attendance: 100; Referees: Konjičanin, Konjičanin (BIH)

26 June 2023; 19:45	Denmark	28–22	Bahrain	Ano Liosia Olympic Hall, Athens; Referees: Gasmi, Gasmi (FRA)
26 June 2023; 19:45	Munk, Termansen 4	(16–7)	Rabia 8	Ano Liosia Olympic Hall, Athens; Referees: Gasmi, Gasmi (FRA)
26 June 2023; 19:45	1× (yellow card) 3× (suspension)	Report	1× (yellow card) 2× (suspension)	Ano Liosia Olympic Hall, Athens; Referees: Gasmi, Gasmi (FRA)

=== Group IV ===
Pos	Team	Pld	W	D	L	GF	GA	GD	Pts	Qualification
1	Iceland	3	3	0	0	90	85	+5	6	Quarterfinals
2	Serbia	3	2	0	1	96	81	+15	4	Quarterfinals
3	Egypt	3	1	0	2	90	92	−2	2	9–16th places
4	Greece (H)	3	0	0	3	81	99	−18	0	9–16th places

Source: IHF
Rules for classification: 1) points; 2) head-to-head points; 3) head-to-head goal difference; 4) head-to-head number of goals scored; 5) goal difference.
(H) Hosts

25 June 2023; 17:30	Iceland	29–28	Greece	Melina Merkouri Indoor Hall, Athens; Referees: Konjičanin, Konjičanin (BIH)
25 June 2023; 17:30	three players 6	(14–15)	Toskas 7	Melina Merkouri Indoor Hall, Athens; Referees: Konjičanin, Konjičanin (BIH)
25 June 2023; 17:30	4× (suspension)	Report	1× (yellow card) 5× (suspension) 1× (red card)	Melina Merkouri Indoor Hall, Athens; Referees: Konjičanin, Konjičanin (BIH)

25 June 2023; 19:45	Egypt	26–33	Serbia	Melina Merkouri Indoor Hall, Athens; Attendance: 250; Referees: Gasmi, Gasmi (FRA)
25 June 2023; 19:45	Abdelhak 10	(12–18)	Zečević 8	Melina Merkouri Indoor Hall, Athens; Attendance: 250; Referees: Gasmi, Gasmi (FRA)
25 June 2023; 19:45	3× (suspension) 1× (red card)	Report	1× (yellow card) 4× (suspension)	Melina Merkouri Indoor Hall, Athens; Attendance: 250; Referees: Gasmi, Gasmi (FRA)

26 June 2023; 17:30	Iceland	29–28	Egypt	Melina Merkouri Indoor Hall, Athens; Attendance: 270; Referees: Mikelić, Paradina (CRO)
26 June 2023; 17:30	Rúnarsson 6	(19–13)	Doieb 11	Melina Merkouri Indoor Hall, Athens; Attendance: 270; Referees: Mikelić, Paradina (CRO)
26 June 2023; 17:30	6× (suspension)	Report	5× (suspension) 1× (red card)	Melina Merkouri Indoor Hall, Athens; Attendance: 270; Referees: Mikelić, Paradina (CRO)

26 June 2023; 19:45	Serbia	34–23	Greece	Melina Merkouri Indoor Hall, Athens; Attendance: 580; Referees: Hannes, Hannes (GER)
26 June 2023; 19:45	Dodić 8	(15–12)	Papagiannis, Vasileiou 4	Melina Merkouri Indoor Hall, Athens; Attendance: 580; Referees: Hannes, Hannes (GER)
26 June 2023; 19:45	1× (suspension)	Report	1× (yellow card) 5× (suspension)	Melina Merkouri Indoor Hall, Athens; Attendance: 580; Referees: Hannes, Hannes (GER)

== Classification games ==
=== 25th–32nd places ===
28 June 2023; 11:00	Argentina	31–20	Chile	Melina Merkouri Indoor Hall, Athens; Attendance: 50; Referees: Mahmoud, El-Beltagy (EGY)
28 June 2023; 11:00	Garay 9	(19–9)	Montecino 6	Melina Merkouri Indoor Hall, Athens; Attendance: 50; Referees: Mahmoud, El-Beltagy (EGY)
28 June 2023; 11:00	2× (suspension)	Report	2× (suspension)	Melina Merkouri Indoor Hall, Athens; Attendance: 50; Referees: Mahmoud, El-Beltagy (EGY)

28 June 2023; 13:00	Greenland	13–47	Cuba	Melina Merkouri Indoor Hall, Athens; Attendance: 55; Referees: Xu, Liu (CHN)
28 June 2023; 13:00	Møller 5	(6–24)	Méndez 9	Melina Merkouri Indoor Hall, Athens; Attendance: 55; Referees: Xu, Liu (CHN)
28 June 2023; 13:00		Report	1× (yellow card) 1× (suspension)	Melina Merkouri Indoor Hall, Athens; Attendance: 55; Referees: Xu, Liu (CHN)

28 June 2023; 15:45	United States	25–23	Costa Rica	Swiss Life Hall, Hanover; Attendance: 304; Referees: Al-Wahibi, Al-Shahi (OMA)
28 June 2023; 15:45	Edwards 7	(14–11)	Vargas 7	Swiss Life Hall, Hanover; Attendance: 304; Referees: Al-Wahibi, Al-Shahi (OMA)
28 June 2023; 15:45	2× (suspension)	Report	1× (suspension)	Swiss Life Hall, Hanover; Attendance: 304; Referees: Al-Wahibi, Al-Shahi (OMA)

28 June 2023; 18:00	Libya	24–32	Angola	Swiss Life Hall, Hanover; Attendance: 304; Referees: Bolic, Hurich (AUT)
28 June 2023; 18:00	Hireebish 6	(9–12)	José 13	Swiss Life Hall, Hanover; Attendance: 304; Referees: Bolic, Hurich (AUT)
28 June 2023; 18:00	1× (yellow card) 2× (suspension)	Report	3× (suspension)	Swiss Life Hall, Hanover; Attendance: 304; Referees: Bolic, Hurich (AUT)

29 June 2023; 11:00	Chile	27–18	Greenland	Melina Merkouri Indoor Hall, Athens; Attendance: 50; Referees: Pirvu, Potirniche (ROU)
29 June 2023; 11:00	Oyarzún 8	(11–8)	Lennert, Rosing	Melina Merkouri Indoor Hall, Athens; Attendance: 50; Referees: Pirvu, Potirniche (ROU)
29 June 2023; 11:00	5× (suspension)	Report	4× (suspension)	Melina Merkouri Indoor Hall, Athens; Attendance: 50; Referees: Pirvu, Potirniche (ROU)

29 June 2023; 13:00	Argentina	43–30	Cuba	Melina Merkouri Indoor Hall, Athens; Attendance: 50; Referees: Picard, Vauchez (FRA)
29 June 2023; 13:00	Jung 9	(22–15)	Cordiés Castillo, Vazques 7	Melina Merkouri Indoor Hall, Athens; Attendance: 50; Referees: Picard, Vauchez (FRA)
29 June 2023; 13:00	2× (suspension)	Report	9× (suspension) 1× (red card)	Melina Merkouri Indoor Hall, Athens; Attendance: 50; Referees: Picard, Vauchez (FRA)

29 June 2023; 15:45	Costa Rica	32–35	Libya	Swiss Life Hall, Hanover; Attendance: 347; Referees: Gheisarian, Gheisarian (IRI)
29 June 2023; 15:45	Cantarero Martínez 9	(12–16)	Abdalla, Irwayhah 8	Swiss Life Hall, Hanover; Attendance: 347; Referees: Gheisarian, Gheisarian (IRI)
29 June 2023; 15:45	1× (suspension)	Report	3× (suspension)	Swiss Life Hall, Hanover; Attendance: 347; Referees: Gheisarian, Gheisarian (IRI)

29 June 2023; 18:00	United States	26–33	Angola	Swiss Life Hall, Hanover; Attendance: 347; Referees: Mitrović, Vešović (MNE)
29 June 2023; 18:00	Walker 9	(12–17)	Pedro 8	Swiss Life Hall, Hanover; Attendance: 347; Referees: Mitrović, Vešović (MNE)
29 June 2023; 18:00	3× (suspension) 1× (red card)	Report	4× (suspension)	Swiss Life Hall, Hanover; Attendance: 347; Referees: Mitrović, Vešović (MNE)

=== 17–24th places ===
28 June 2023; 11:00	Poland	27–21	Kuwait	Swiss Life Hall, Hanover; Attendance: 3,272; Referees: Mitrović, Vešović (MNE)
28 June 2023; 11:00	Powarzyński 8	(14–8)	Al-Dawani 10	Swiss Life Hall, Hanover; Attendance: 3,272; Referees: Mitrović, Vešović (MNE)
28 June 2023; 11:00	4× (suspension)	Report	2× (suspension)	Swiss Life Hall, Hanover; Attendance: 3,272; Referees: Mitrović, Vešović (MNE)

28 June 2023; 13:15	Algeria	30–37	Japan	Swiss Life Hall, Hanover; Attendance: 204; Referees: Gheisarian, Gheisarian (IRI)
28 June 2023; 13:15	Nidhal 9	(14–17)	Fujisaka 11	Swiss Life Hall, Hanover; Attendance: 204; Referees: Gheisarian, Gheisarian (IRI)
28 June 2023; 13:15	1× (yellow card) 1× (suspension)	Report	1× (suspension)	Swiss Life Hall, Hanover; Attendance: 204; Referees: Gheisarian, Gheisarian (IRI)

28 June 2023; 15:00	Norway	35–22	Saudi Arabia	Melina Merkouri Indoor Hall, Athens; Attendance: 33; Referees: Mikelić, Paradina (CRO)
28 June 2023; 15:00	Høiness 10	(15–11)	Al-Fardan, Al-Khedhrawi 5	Melina Merkouri Indoor Hall, Athens; Attendance: 33; Referees: Mikelić, Paradina (CRO)
28 June 2023; 15:00	4× (suspension) 1× (red card)	Report	5× (suspension)	Melina Merkouri Indoor Hall, Athens; Attendance: 33; Referees: Mikelić, Paradina (CRO)

28 June 2023; 17:00	Slovenia	39–21	Morocco	Melina Merkouri Indoor Hall, Athens; Attendance: 50; Referees: Picard, Vauchez (FRA)
28 June 2023; 17:00	Miklavec 8	(17–10)	Kissar 5	Melina Merkouri Indoor Hall, Athens; Attendance: 50; Referees: Picard, Vauchez (FRA)
28 June 2023; 17:00	2× (suspension)	Report	4× (suspension) 1× (red card)	Melina Merkouri Indoor Hall, Athens; Attendance: 50; Referees: Picard, Vauchez (FRA)

29 June 2023; 11:00	Kuwait	27–36	Algeria	Swiss Life Hall, Hanover; Attendance: 3,215; Referees: Bolic, Hurich (AUT)
29 June 2023; 11:00	Al-Dawani 8	(14–15)	Ramy 9	Swiss Life Hall, Hanover; Attendance: 3,215; Referees: Bolic, Hurich (AUT)
29 June 2023; 11:00	3× (suspension)	Report	3× (suspension)	Swiss Life Hall, Hanover; Attendance: 3,215; Referees: Bolic, Hurich (AUT)

29 June 2023; 13:15	Poland	28–22	Japan	Swiss Life Hall, Hanover; Attendance: 540; Referees: Sekulić, Jovandić (SRB)
29 June 2023; 13:15	Molski, Powarzyński 5	(12–11)	Fujisaka 8	Swiss Life Hall, Hanover; Attendance: 540; Referees: Sekulić, Jovandić (SRB)
29 June 2023; 13:15	1× (yellow card) 4× (suspension)	Report	1× (yellow card) 4× (suspension)	Swiss Life Hall, Hanover; Attendance: 540; Referees: Sekulić, Jovandić (SRB)

29 June 2023; 15:00	Saudi Arabia	25–20	Morocco	Melina Merkouri Indoor Hall, Athens; Attendance: 50; Referees: Bozhinovski, Nachevski (MKD)
29 June 2023; 15:00	Al-Abdullah 8	(15–10)	Boukhamsa 6	Melina Merkouri Indoor Hall, Athens; Attendance: 50; Referees: Bozhinovski, Nachevski (MKD)
29 June 2023; 15:00	3× (suspension)	Report	3× (suspension)	Melina Merkouri Indoor Hall, Athens; Attendance: 50; Referees: Bozhinovski, Nachevski (MKD)

29 June 2023; 17:00	Norway	28–24	Slovenia	Melina Merkouri Indoor Hall, Athens; Attendance: 50; Referees: Hannes, Hannes (GER)
29 June 2023; 17:00	Haugli, Høiness 5	(13–14)	Mlivić 8	Melina Merkouri Indoor Hall, Athens; Attendance: 50; Referees: Hannes, Hannes (GER)
29 June 2023; 17:00	2× (yellow card) 5× (suspension)	Report	4× (suspension)	Melina Merkouri Indoor Hall, Athens; Attendance: 50; Referees: Hannes, Hannes (GER)

=== 9–16th places ===
28 June 2023; 10:45	France	35–21	Brazil	Max-Schmeling-Halle, Berlin; Attendance: 5,656; Referees: Budzák, Záhradník (SVK)
28 June 2023; 10:45	Vincent 8	(17–9)	Monta da Silva 8	Max-Schmeling-Halle, Berlin; Attendance: 5,656; Referees: Budzák, Záhradník (SVK)
28 June 2023; 10:45	2× (suspension)	Report	2× (suspension)	Max-Schmeling-Halle, Berlin; Attendance: 5,656; Referees: Budzák, Záhradník (SVK)

28 June 2023; 13:00	Tunisia	29–40	Spain	Max-Schmeling-Halle, Berlin; Attendance: 2,500; Referees: Doychinov, Goretsov (BUL)
28 June 2023; 13:00	Ben Fraj 8	(12–21)	Álvarez 11	Max-Schmeling-Halle, Berlin; Attendance: 2,500; Referees: Doychinov, Goretsov (BUL)
28 June 2023; 13:00	4× (suspension)	Report	1× (suspension)	Max-Schmeling-Halle, Berlin; Attendance: 2,500; Referees: Doychinov, Goretsov (BUL)

28 June 2023; 19:00	Sweden	39–29	Greece	Melina Merkouri Indoor Hall, Athens; Attendance: 260; Referees: Pirvu, Potirniche (ROU)
28 June 2023; 19:00	Palmar 8	(20–15)	Dikaioulias 7	Melina Merkouri Indoor Hall, Athens; Attendance: 260; Referees: Pirvu, Potirniche (ROU)
28 June 2023; 19:00	5× (suspension)	Report	3× (suspension)	Melina Merkouri Indoor Hall, Athens; Attendance: 260; Referees: Pirvu, Potirniche (ROU)

28 June 2023; 21:00	Bahrain	27–31	Egypt	Melina Merkouri Indoor Hall, Athens; Attendance: 40; Referees: Bozhinovski, Nachevski (MKD)
28 June 2023; 21:00	three players 5	(16–15)	three players 6	Melina Merkouri Indoor Hall, Athens; Attendance: 40; Referees: Bozhinovski, Nachevski (MKD)
28 June 2023; 21:00	4× (suspension) 1× (red card)	Report	1× (suspension) 1× (red card)	Melina Merkouri Indoor Hall, Athens; Attendance: 40; Referees: Bozhinovski, Nachevski (MKD)

29 June 2023; 09:00	Brazil	23–26	Tunisia	Max-Schmeling-Halle, Berlin; Attendance: 4,500; Referees: Konjičanin, Konjičanin (BIH)
29 June 2023; 09:00	Quintino 6	(14–11)	Ben Fraj 6	Max-Schmeling-Halle, Berlin; Attendance: 4,500; Referees: Konjičanin, Konjičanin (BIH)
29 June 2023; 09:00	4× (suspension) 1× (red card)	Report	1× (yellow card) 3× (suspension)	Max-Schmeling-Halle, Berlin; Attendance: 4,500; Referees: Konjičanin, Konjičanin (BIH)

29 June 2023; 11:00	France	36–42	Spain	Max-Schmeling-Halle, Berlin; Attendance: 6,689; Referees: Belkhiri, Hamidi (ALG)
29 June 2023; 11:00	Vincent 10	(18–19)	Gurri Aregay 10	Max-Schmeling-Halle, Berlin; Attendance: 6,689; Referees: Belkhiri, Hamidi (ALG)
29 June 2023; 11:00	1× (yellow card) 3× (suspension)	Report	3× (suspension)	Max-Schmeling-Halle, Berlin; Attendance: 6,689; Referees: Belkhiri, Hamidi (ALG)

29 June 2023; 19:00	Greece	29–38	Bahrain	Melina Merkouri Indoor Hall, Athens; Attendance: 120; Referees: Mikelić, Paradina (CRO)
29 June 2023; 19:00	Tzortzinis 6	(13–18)	Rabia 10	Melina Merkouri Indoor Hall, Athens; Attendance: 120; Referees: Mikelić, Paradina (CRO)
29 June 2023; 19:00	1× (yellow card) 5× (suspension) 1× (red card)	Report	3× (suspension)	Melina Merkouri Indoor Hall, Athens; Attendance: 120; Referees: Mikelić, Paradina (CRO)

29 June 2023; 21:00	Sweden	35–37	Egypt	Melina Merkouri Indoor Hall, Athens; Attendance: 50; Referees: Magalhães, Godoy (BRA)
29 June 2023; 21:00	Möller 11	(17–16)	O. Mohamed 10	Melina Merkouri Indoor Hall, Athens; Attendance: 50; Referees: Magalhães, Godoy (BRA)
29 June 2023; 21:00	3× (suspension)	Report	4× (suspension)	Melina Merkouri Indoor Hall, Athens; Attendance: 50; Referees: Magalhães, Godoy (BRA)

== Knockout stage ==
=== Bracket ===
Championship bracket

Quarter-finals
29 June
Germany	31
Denmark	26
29 June
Faroe Islands	27
Serbia	30
29 June
Hungary	28
Croatia	23
29 June
Iceland	32
Portugal	28

Semi-finals
1 July
Germany	40
Serbia	30
1 July
Hungary	37
Iceland	30

Final
2 July
Germany	30
Hungary	23
Third place
2 July
Serbia	23
Iceland	27

5–8th place bracket

5–8th place semifinals
1 July
Denmark	26
Faroe Islands	23
1 July
Croatia	32
Portugal	36

Fifth place game
2 July
Denmark	30
Portugal	25
Seventh place game
2 July
Faroe Islands	31
Croatia	27

=== Quarterfinals ===
29 June 2023; 13:15	Faroe Islands	27–30	Serbia	Max-Schmeling-Halle, Berlin; Attendance: 2,083; Referees: Doychinov, Goretsov (BUL)
29 June 2023; 13:15	E. Ellefsen á Skipagøtu 9	(12–17)	Kos, Stanisavljević 7	Max-Schmeling-Halle, Berlin; Attendance: 2,083; Referees: Doychinov, Goretsov (BUL)
29 June 2023; 13:15	1× (yellow card) 1× (suspension)	Report	1× (yellow card) 6× (suspension)	Max-Schmeling-Halle, Berlin; Attendance: 2,083; Referees: Doychinov, Goretsov (BUL)

29 June 2023; 15:45	Iceland	32–28	Portugal	Max-Schmeling-Halle, Berlin; Attendance: 2,083; Referees: Lovin, Stancu (ROU)
29 June 2023; 15:45	Gunnarsson 11	(12–14)	Sousa 6	Max-Schmeling-Halle, Berlin; Attendance: 2,083; Referees: Lovin, Stancu (ROU)
29 June 2023; 15:45	2× (yellow card) 4× (suspension)	Report	1× (yellow card) 4× (suspension) 1× (red card)	Max-Schmeling-Halle, Berlin; Attendance: 2,083; Referees: Lovin, Stancu (ROU)

29 June 2023; 18:30	Hungary	28–23	Croatia	Max-Schmeling-Halle, Berlin; Attendance: 2,653; Referees: Gasmi, Gasmi (FRA)
29 June 2023; 18:30	Lukács 5	(13–13)	Raužan 7	Max-Schmeling-Halle, Berlin; Attendance: 2,653; Referees: Gasmi, Gasmi (FRA)
29 June 2023; 18:30	4× (suspension)	Report	1× (yellow card) 2× (suspension)	Max-Schmeling-Halle, Berlin; Attendance: 2,653; Referees: Gasmi, Gasmi (FRA)

29 June 2023; 21:00	Germany	31–26	Denmark	Max-Schmeling-Halle, Berlin; Attendance: 3,734; Referees: Bíró, Kiss (HUN)
29 June 2023; 21:00	Lichtlein 7	(17–11)	Knudsen, Nevers 5	Max-Schmeling-Halle, Berlin; Attendance: 3,734; Referees: Bíró, Kiss (HUN)
29 June 2023; 21:00	4× (suspension)	Report	2× (suspension)	Max-Schmeling-Halle, Berlin; Attendance: 3,734; Referees: Bíró, Kiss (HUN)

=== 5–8th place semifinals ===
1 July 2023; 10:00	Denmark	26–23	Faroe Islands	Max-Schmeling-Halle, Berlin; Attendance: 1,119; Referees: Sosa, Lemes (URU)
1 July 2023; 10:00	T. Arnoldsen, Mørch-Rasmussen 5	(13–10)	three players 5	Max-Schmeling-Halle, Berlin; Attendance: 1,119; Referees: Sosa, Lemes (URU)
1 July 2023; 10:00	4× (suspension)	Report	1× (yellow card) 2× (suspension)	Max-Schmeling-Halle, Berlin; Attendance: 1,119; Referees: Sosa, Lemes (URU)

1 July 2023; 12:30	Croatia	32–36	Portugal	Max-Schmeling-Halle, Berlin; Attendance: 1,119; Referees: Braseth, Sundet (NOR)
1 July 2023; 12:30	Barbić 8	(17–17)	Sousa 8	Max-Schmeling-Halle, Berlin; Attendance: 1,119; Referees: Braseth, Sundet (NOR)
1 July 2023; 12:30	2× (suspension)	Report	2× (yellow card) 4× (suspension)	Max-Schmeling-Halle, Berlin; Attendance: 1,119; Referees: Braseth, Sundet (NOR)

=== Semifinals ===
1 July 2023; 15:30	Hungary	37–30	Iceland	Max-Schmeling-Halle, Berlin; Attendance: 3,138; Referees: Konjičanin, Konjičanin (BIH)
1 July 2023; 15:30	Karai, Sztraka 5	(19–14)	three players 4	Max-Schmeling-Halle, Berlin; Attendance: 3,138; Referees: Konjičanin, Konjičanin (BIH)
1 July 2023; 15:30	4× (suspension)	Report	1× (yellow card) 4× (suspension)	Max-Schmeling-Halle, Berlin; Attendance: 3,138; Referees: Konjičanin, Konjičanin (BIH)

1 July 2023; 18:00	Germany	40–30	Serbia	Max-Schmeling-Halle, Berlin; Attendance: 5,206; Referees: Belkhiri, Hamidi (ALG)
1 July 2023; 18:00	Uščins 9	(17–15)	Kos 9	Max-Schmeling-Halle, Berlin; Attendance: 5,206; Referees: Belkhiri, Hamidi (ALG)
1 July 2023; 18:00	2× (yellow card) 4× (suspension)	Report	1× (yellow card) 5× (suspension) 1× (red card)	Max-Schmeling-Halle, Berlin; Attendance: 5,206; Referees: Belkhiri, Hamidi (ALG)

=== Seventh place game ===
2 July 2023; 10:00	Faroe Islands	31–27	Croatia	Max-Schmeling-Halle, Berlin; Attendance: 600; Referees: Bíró, Kiss (HUN)
2 July 2023; 10:00	R. Ellefsen á Skipagøtu 5	(16–14)	Raužan, Šestak 5	Max-Schmeling-Halle, Berlin; Attendance: 600; Referees: Bíró, Kiss (HUN)
2 July 2023; 10:00	1× (suspension)	Report	4× (suspension)	Max-Schmeling-Halle, Berlin; Attendance: 600; Referees: Bíró, Kiss (HUN)

=== Fifth place game ===
2 July 2023; 12:30	Denmark	30–25	Portugal	Max-Schmeling-Halle, Berlin; Attendance: 1,308; Referees: Gasmi, Gasmi (FRA)
2 July 2023; 12:30	Boldsen 6	(16–13)	Costa, Gomes 5	Max-Schmeling-Halle, Berlin; Attendance: 1,308; Referees: Gasmi, Gasmi (FRA)
2 July 2023; 12:30	2× (suspension)	Report	1× (yellow card) 2× (suspension)	Max-Schmeling-Halle, Berlin; Attendance: 1,308; Referees: Gasmi, Gasmi (FRA)

=== Third place game ===
2 July 2023; 15:30	Serbia	23–27	Iceland	Max-Schmeling-Halle, Berlin; Attendance: 4,467; Referees: Braseth, Sundet (NOR)
2 July 2023; 15:30	Kos 6	(13–13)	Gunnarsson 8	Max-Schmeling-Halle, Berlin; Attendance: 4,467; Referees: Braseth, Sundet (NOR)
2 July 2023; 15:30	2× (yellow card) 4× (suspension)	Report	5× (suspension)	Max-Schmeling-Halle, Berlin; Attendance: 4,467; Referees: Braseth, Sundet (NOR)

=== Final ===
2 July 2023; 18:00	Germany	30–23	Hungary	Max-Schmeling-Halle, Berlin; Attendance: 8,235; Referees: Sosa, Lemes (URU)
2 July 2023; 18:00	Fischer, Scholtes 6	(14–11)	Imre 5	Max-Schmeling-Halle, Berlin; Attendance: 8,235; Referees: Sosa, Lemes (URU)
2 July 2023; 18:00	1× (yellow card) 2× (suspension)	Report	1× (suspension)	Max-Schmeling-Halle, Berlin; Attendance: 8,235; Referees: Sosa, Lemes (URU)

== Final ranking ==
Rank	Team
1st place, gold medalist(s)	Germany
2nd place, silver medalist(s)	Hungary
3rd place, bronze medalist(s)	Iceland
4	Serbia
5	Denmark
6	Portugal
7	Faroe Islands
8	Croatia
9	Spain
10	Egypt
11	France
12	Sweden
13	Bahrain
14	Tunisia
15	Greece
16	Brazil
17	Poland
18	Norway
19	Japan
20	Slovenia
21	Saudi Arabia
22	Algeria
23	Morocco
24	Kuwait
25	Argentina
26	Angola
27	United States
28	Cuba
29	Chile
30	Libya
31	Costa Rica
32	Greenland

== Statistics and awards ==
=== Top goalscorers ===
Rank	Name	Goals	Shots	%
1	(Faroe Islands) Elias Ellefsen á Skipagøtu	55	91	60
1	(Japan) Naoki Fujisaka	55	94	59
3	(Serbia) Miloš Kos	50	88	57
4	(Sweden) Kasper Palmar	49	77	64
5	(Cuba) Maiko Vazques	48	81	59
6	(Argentina) Martin Jung	47	75	63
6	(Portugal) André Sousa	47	74	64
8	(Kuwait) Saif Al-Dawani	46	81	57
9	(Bahrain) Mohamed Rabia	44	60	73
9	(France) Mattéo Fadhuile-Crepy	44	65	68

Source: IHF

=== Top goalkeepers ===
Rank	Name	%	Saves	Shots
1	(Argentina) Gonzalo Guerra	40	35	88
2	(Poland) Jakub Ałaj	40	40	101
3	(France) Quentin Hulot	39	7	18
4	(Norway) Hans Gran	38	15	39
5	(Sweden) Alexander Lindén	38	63	166
6	(Serbia) Luka Krivokapić	36	93	256
7	(Faroe Islands) Aleksandar Lacok	36	40	112
8	(Germany) David Späth	35	57	161
9	(Serbia) Marko Mrdović	35	12	34
10	(Libya) Yousef Gharor	35	7	20

Source: IHF

=== Awards ===
The All-star Team was announced on 2 July 2023.

Position	Player
Goalkeeper	(Germany) David Späth
Right wing	(Iceland) Kristófer Máni Jónasson
Right back	(Hungary) Zoran Ilić
Centre back	(Faroe Islands) Elias Ellefsen á Skipagøtu
Left back	(Serbia) Miloš Kos
Left wing	(Portugal) Pedro Oliveira
Pivot	(Germany) Justus Fischer
MVP	(Germany) Nils Lichtlein
