= South and Central American Men's Junior Handball Championship =

Handball competition

- Current season, competition or edition: 2026 South and Central American Men's Junior Handball Championship
- Sport: Handball
- Founded: 2019
- First season: 2019
- No. of teams: 6
- Continent: SCAHC (South America/Central America)
- Most recent champion: Brazil (2nd title)
- Most titles: Argentina; Brazil (2 titles each)

The South and Central American Men's Junior Handball Championship is the official competition for junior (U-20) national handball teams of South America and Central America, and takes place every two years. In addition to crowning the South and Central American junior champions, the tournament also serves as a qualifying tournament for the World Junior Handball Championship. The first tournament was held in 2019 in Palmira, Colombia.

== Summaries ==
Year	Host	Final			Third place match		
Year	Host	Champion	Score	Runner-up	Third place	Score	Fourth place
2019; Details	(Colombia); Palmira	Argentina	Round-robin	Brazil	Chile	Round-robin	Venezuela
2022; Details	(Argentina); Buenos Aires	Brazil	27–25	Argentina	Chile	26–15	Costa Rica
2024; Details	(Nicaragua); Managua	Argentina	26–25	Brazil	Uruguay	23–14	Chile
2026; Details	(Paraguay); Asunción	Brazil	32–24	Argentina	Chile	26–23	Uruguay

== Medal table ==
Rank	Nation	Gold	Silver	Bronze	Total
1	Argentina	2	2	0	4
1	Brazil	2	2	0	4
3	Chile	0	0	3	3
4	Uruguay	0	0	1	1
Totals (4 entries)		4	4	4	12

== Participating nations ==
Team	(Colombia); 2019	(Argentina); 2022	(Nicaragua); 2024	(Paraguay); 2026	Years
Argentina	1st	2nd	1st	2nd	4
Brazil	2nd	1st	2nd	1st	4
Chile	3rd	3rd	4th	3rd	4
Colombia	5th		6th	6th	3
Costa Rica		4th			1
French Guiana		7th		5th	2
Guatemala		8th	8th	8th	3
Nicaragua			5th	7th	2
Paraguay	6th	5th			2
Uruguay		6th	3rd	4th	3
Venezuela	4th		7th		2
Total	6	8	8	8	
