= 2024 South and Central American Men's Junior Handball Championship =

Tournament details
- Host country: Nicaragua
- Venue(s): 1 (in 1 host city)
- Dates: 29 October – 2 November
- Teams: 8 (from 1 confederation)

Final positions
- Champions: Argentina (2nd title)
- Runner-up: Brazil
- Third place: Uruguay
- Fourth place: Chile

Tournament statistics
- Matches played: 20
- Goals scored: 1,105 (55.25 per match)
- Attendance: 2,145 (107 per match)

The 2024 South and Central American Men's Junior Handball Championship took place in Managua, Nicaragua, from 29 October to 2 November 2024. It acted as the South and Central American qualifying tournament for the 2025 IHF Men's U21 Handball World Championship.

== Qualification ==
Qualification	Host	Dates	Vacancies	Qualified
Automated entry			4	Argentina; Brazil; Chile; Uruguay
IHF Trophy South and Central America – Central American Zone	(Nicaragua) Managua	16–20 April 2024	2	Guatemala; Nicaragua
IHF Trophy South and Central America – South American Zone	(Colombia) Palmira	23–27 April 2024	2	Colombia; Venezuela

== Preliminary round ==
All times are local (UTC–6).

=== Group A ===
Pos	Team	Pld	W	D	L	GF	GA	GD	Pts	Qualification
1	Argentina	3	3	0	0	104	55	+49	6	Semifinals
2	Chile	3	2	0	1	83	64	+19	4	Semifinals
3	Venezuela	3	1	0	2	76	85	−9	2	5–8th place semifinals
4	Guatemala	3	0	0	3	44	103	−59	0	5–8th place semifinals

Rules for classification: 1) Points; 2) Head-to-head points; 3) Head-to-head goal difference; 4) Head-to-head goals scored; 5) Goal difference; 6) Goals scored; 7) Draw.

29 October 2024; 11:00	Chile	29–11	Guatemala	Gimnasio Nacional de Balonmano, Managua; Attendance: 100; Referees: Santana, Ramalho (BRA)
29 October 2024; 11:00	three players 4	(13–5)	García, Ronquillo 3	Gimnasio Nacional de Balonmano, Managua; Attendance: 100; Referees: Santana, Ramalho (BRA)
29 October 2024; 11:00	1× (suspension)	Report	5× (suspension) 1× (red card)	Gimnasio Nacional de Balonmano, Managua; Attendance: 100; Referees: Santana, Ramalho (BRA)

29 October 2024; 13:00	Argentina	36–17	Venezuela	Gimnasio Nacional de Balonmano, Managua; Attendance: 80; Referees: Sepúlveda, Leyton (CHI)
29 October 2024; 13:00	Rodríguez 6	(17–9)	Quintero, Toledo 4	Gimnasio Nacional de Balonmano, Managua; Attendance: 80; Referees: Sepúlveda, Leyton (CHI)
29 October 2024; 13:00	1× (yellow card) 2× (suspension)	Report	1× (yellow card) 2× (suspension) 1× (red card) 1×	Gimnasio Nacional de Balonmano, Managua; Attendance: 80; Referees: Sepúlveda, Leyton (CHI)

30 October 2024; 11:00	Guatemala	13–41	Argentina	Gimnasio Nacional de Balonmano, Managua; Attendance: 75; Referees: Lenzue, Burgos (URU)
30 October 2024; 11:00	Juárez 7	(3–21)	Montoto, Silva 6	Gimnasio Nacional de Balonmano, Managua; Attendance: 75; Referees: Lenzue, Burgos (URU)
30 October 2024; 11:00	3× (suspension)	Report	3× (suspension)	Gimnasio Nacional de Balonmano, Managua; Attendance: 75; Referees: Lenzue, Burgos (URU)

30 October 2024; 13:00	Venezuela	26–29	Chile	Gimnasio Nacional de Balonmano, Managua; Attendance: 66; Referees: Petrone, Rueda (ARG)
30 October 2024; 13:00	Toledo 7	(12–11)	Cabrera 7	Gimnasio Nacional de Balonmano, Managua; Attendance: 66; Referees: Petrone, Rueda (ARG)
30 October 2024; 13:00	2× (suspension) 1× (red card)	Report	3× (suspension)	Gimnasio Nacional de Balonmano, Managua; Attendance: 66; Referees: Petrone, Rueda (ARG)

31 October 2024; 11:00	Argentina	27–25	Chile	Gimnasio Nacional de Balonmano, Managua; Attendance: 55; Referees: Gonçalves, Dezembro (BRA)
31 October 2024; 11:00	Maya 7	(9–14)	Cabrera 8	Gimnasio Nacional de Balonmano, Managua; Attendance: 55; Referees: Gonçalves, Dezembro (BRA)
31 October 2024; 11:00	4× (suspension)	Report	3× (suspension)	Gimnasio Nacional de Balonmano, Managua; Attendance: 55; Referees: Gonçalves, Dezembro (BRA)

31 October 2024; 13:00	Venezuela	33–20	Guatemala	Gimnasio Nacional de Balonmano, Managua; Attendance: 59; Referees: Bohoiavlenska, Molina (USA)
31 October 2024; 13:00	Toledo 8	(18–10)	Juárez 6	Gimnasio Nacional de Balonmano, Managua; Attendance: 59; Referees: Bohoiavlenska, Molina (USA)
31 October 2024; 13:00	3× (suspension)	Report	1× (suspension)	Gimnasio Nacional de Balonmano, Managua; Attendance: 59; Referees: Bohoiavlenska, Molina (USA)

=== Group B ===
Pos	Team	Pld	W	D	L	GF	GA	GD	Pts	Qualification
1	Brazil	3	3	0	0	109	62	+47	6	Semifinals
2	Uruguay	3	2	0	1	92	79	+13	4	Semifinals
3	Nicaragua (H)	3	1	0	2	91	110	−19	2	5–8th place semifinals
4	Colombia	3	0	0	3	78	119	−41	0	5–8th place semifinals

Rules for classification: 1) Points; 2) Head-to-head points; 3) Head-to-head goal difference; 4) Head-to-head goals scored; 5) Goal difference; 6) Goals scored; 7) Draw.
(H) Hosts

29 October 2024; 17:00	Uruguay	43–22	Colombia	Gimnasio Nacional de Balonmano, Managua; Attendance: 90; Referees: Petrone, Rueda (ARG)
29 October 2024; 17:00	Castro, Larrosa 8	(19–11)	Gallego 7	Gimnasio Nacional de Balonmano, Managua; Attendance: 90; Referees: Petrone, Rueda (ARG)
29 October 2024; 17:00	1× (yellow card) 4× (suspension)	Report	5× (suspension)	Gimnasio Nacional de Balonmano, Managua; Attendance: 90; Referees: Petrone, Rueda (ARG)

29 October 2024; 19:00	Brazil	41–26	Nicaragua	Gimnasio Nacional de Balonmano, Managua; Attendance: 200; Referees: Gutiérrez, Aguilera (CHI)
29 October 2024; 19:00	L. da Silva 7	(17–10)	Martínez 7	Gimnasio Nacional de Balonmano, Managua; Attendance: 200; Referees: Gutiérrez, Aguilera (CHI)
29 October 2024; 19:00	1× (yellow card) 6× (suspension) 1× (red card)	Report	1× (yellow card) 6× (suspension)	Gimnasio Nacional de Balonmano, Managua; Attendance: 200; Referees: Gutiérrez, Aguilera (CHI)

30 October 2024; 17:00	Colombia	23–41	Brazil	Gimnasio Nacional de Balonmano, Managua; Attendance: 70; Referees: Bohoiavlenska, Molina (USA)
30 October 2024; 17:00	Herrera, Rendón 6	(10–19)	Lindoso 7	Gimnasio Nacional de Balonmano, Managua; Attendance: 70; Referees: Bohoiavlenska, Molina (USA)
30 October 2024; 17:00	6× (suspension) 1× (red card)	Report	4× (suspension) 1× (red card)	Gimnasio Nacional de Balonmano, Managua; Attendance: 70; Referees: Bohoiavlenska, Molina (USA)

30 October 2024; 19:00	Nicaragua	30–36	Uruguay	Gimnasio Nacional de Balonmano, Managua; Attendance: 230; Referees: Gonçalves, Dezembro (BRA)
30 October 2024; 19:00	González, Lewin 6	(16–16)	Odera 7	Gimnasio Nacional de Balonmano, Managua; Attendance: 230; Referees: Gonçalves, Dezembro (BRA)
30 October 2024; 19:00	4× (suspension)	Report	1× (yellow card) 6× (suspension)	Gimnasio Nacional de Balonmano, Managua; Attendance: 230; Referees: Gonçalves, Dezembro (BRA)

31 October 2024; 17:00	Brazil	27–13	Uruguay	Gimnasio Nacional de Balonmano, Managua; Attendance: 60; Referees: Gutiérrez, Aguilera (CHI)
31 October 2024; 17:00	Perin 8	(11–7)	Larrosa 3	Gimnasio Nacional de Balonmano, Managua; Attendance: 60; Referees: Gutiérrez, Aguilera (CHI)
31 October 2024; 17:00	2× (yellow card) 5× (suspension)	Report	3× (suspension)	Gimnasio Nacional de Balonmano, Managua; Attendance: 60; Referees: Gutiérrez, Aguilera (CHI)

31 October 2024; 19:00	Nicaragua	35–33	Colombia	Gimnasio Nacional de Balonmano, Managua; Attendance: 110; Referees: Santana, Ramalho (BRA)
31 October 2024; 19:00	González 13	(18–14)	Rivera 9	Gimnasio Nacional de Balonmano, Managua; Attendance: 110; Referees: Santana, Ramalho (BRA)
31 October 2024; 19:00	3× (suspension)	Report	6× (suspension) 1× (red card)	Gimnasio Nacional de Balonmano, Managua; Attendance: 110; Referees: Santana, Ramalho (BRA)

== Knockout stage ==
=== Bracket ===
Semi-finals
1 November
Argentina	27
Uruguay	16
1 November
Brazil	32
Chile	14

Final
2 November
Argentina	26
Brazil	25
Third place
2 November
Uruguay	23
Chile	14

5–8th place bracket

5–8th place semifinals
1 November
Venezuela	30
Colombia	41
1 November
Nicaragua	32
Guatemala	30

Fifth place
2 November
Colombia	30
Nicaragua	33
Seventh place
2 November
Venezuela	32
Guatemala	23

=== 5–8th place semifinals ===
1 November 2024; 11:00	Venezuela	30–41	Colombia	Gimnasio Nacional de Balonmano, Managua; Attendance: 50; Referees: Burgos, Lenzue (URU)
1 November 2024; 11:00	Lara 9	(12–16)	Gallego 10	Gimnasio Nacional de Balonmano, Managua; Attendance: 50; Referees: Burgos, Lenzue (URU)
1 November 2024; 11:00	1× (yellow card) 5× (suspension) 1× (red card)	Report	2× (suspension)	Gimnasio Nacional de Balonmano, Managua; Attendance: 50; Referees: Burgos, Lenzue (URU)

1 November 2024; 13:00	Nicaragua	32–30	Guatemala	Gimnasio Nacional de Balonmano, Managua; Attendance: 90; Referees: Sepúlveda, Leyton (CHI)
1 November 2024; 13:00	González 8	(15–13)	Juárez 9	Gimnasio Nacional de Balonmano, Managua; Attendance: 90; Referees: Sepúlveda, Leyton (CHI)
1 November 2024; 13:00	3× (suspension)	Report	6× (suspension) 1× (red card)	Gimnasio Nacional de Balonmano, Managua; Attendance: 90; Referees: Sepúlveda, Leyton (CHI)

=== Semifinals ===
1 November 2024; 17:00	Argentina	27–16	Uruguay	Gimnasio Nacional de Balonmano, Managua; Attendance: 100; Referees: Bohoiavlenska, Molina (USA)
1 November 2024; 17:00	Silva 5	(14–8)	Larrosa 5	Gimnasio Nacional de Balonmano, Managua; Attendance: 100; Referees: Bohoiavlenska, Molina (USA)
1 November 2024; 17:00	5× (suspension)	Report	1× (yellow card) 1× (suspension)	Gimnasio Nacional de Balonmano, Managua; Attendance: 100; Referees: Bohoiavlenska, Molina (USA)

1 November 2024; 19:00	Brazil	32–14	Chile	Gimnasio Nacional de Balonmano, Managua; Attendance: 96; Referees: Petrone, Rueda (ARG)
1 November 2024; 19:00	Perin 5	(13–6)	Cabrera 4	Gimnasio Nacional de Balonmano, Managua; Attendance: 96; Referees: Petrone, Rueda (ARG)
1 November 2024; 19:00	1× (yellow card) 3× (suspension)	Report		Gimnasio Nacional de Balonmano, Managua; Attendance: 96; Referees: Petrone, Rueda (ARG)

=== Seventh place game ===
2 November 2024; 11:00	Venezuela	32–23	Guatemala	Gimnasio Nacional de Balonmano, Managua; Attendance: 90; Referees: Santana, Ramalho (BRA)
2 November 2024; 11:00	Toledo 8	(14–14)	García, Juárez 5	Gimnasio Nacional de Balonmano, Managua; Attendance: 90; Referees: Santana, Ramalho (BRA)
2 November 2024; 11:00	2× (suspension)	Report		Gimnasio Nacional de Balonmano, Managua; Attendance: 90; Referees: Santana, Ramalho (BRA)

=== Fifth place game ===
2 November 2024; 13:00	Colombia	30–33	Nicaragua	Gimnasio Nacional de Balonmano, Managua; Attendance: 220; Referees: Lenzue, Burgos (URU)
2 November 2024; 13:00	Rivera 7	(17–17)	González 10	Gimnasio Nacional de Balonmano, Managua; Attendance: 220; Referees: Lenzue, Burgos (URU)
2 November 2024; 13:00	7× (suspension)	Report	3× (suspension)	Gimnasio Nacional de Balonmano, Managua; Attendance: 220; Referees: Lenzue, Burgos (URU)

=== Third place game ===
2 November 2024; 17:00	Uruguay	23–14	Chile	Gimnasio Nacional de Balonmano, Managua; Attendance: 54; Referees: Gonçalves, Dezembro (BRA)
2 November 2024; 17:00	Urbina 5	(13–6)	Hernández, Sovino 4	Gimnasio Nacional de Balonmano, Managua; Attendance: 54; Referees: Gonçalves, Dezembro (BRA)
2 November 2024; 17:00	1× (yellow card) 3× (suspension)	Report	2× (suspension)	Gimnasio Nacional de Balonmano, Managua; Attendance: 54; Referees: Gonçalves, Dezembro (BRA)

=== Final ===
2 November 2024; 19:00	Argentina	26–25	Brazil	Gimnasio Nacional de Balonmano, Managua; Attendance: 250; Referees: Gutiérrez, Aguilera (CHI)
2 November 2024; 19:00	Gallardo 5	(12–14)	L. da Silva 9	Gimnasio Nacional de Balonmano, Managua; Attendance: 250; Referees: Gutiérrez, Aguilera (CHI)
2 November 2024; 19:00	2× (yellow card) 1× (suspension)	Report	2× (yellow card) 2× (suspension)	Gimnasio Nacional de Balonmano, Managua; Attendance: 250; Referees: Gutiérrez, Aguilera (CHI)

== Final standing ==
Rank	Team
1st place, gold medalist(s)	Argentina
2nd place, silver medalist(s)	Brazil
3rd place, bronze medalist(s)	Uruguay
4	Chile
5	Nicaragua
6	Colombia
7	Venezuela
8	Guatemala

Qualified for the 2025 Men's U21 World Championship
Qualified for the 2025 IHF Inter-Continental Trophy
