= Elias Ellefsen á Skipagøtu =

Faroese handball player (born 2002)

Elias á Skipagøtu
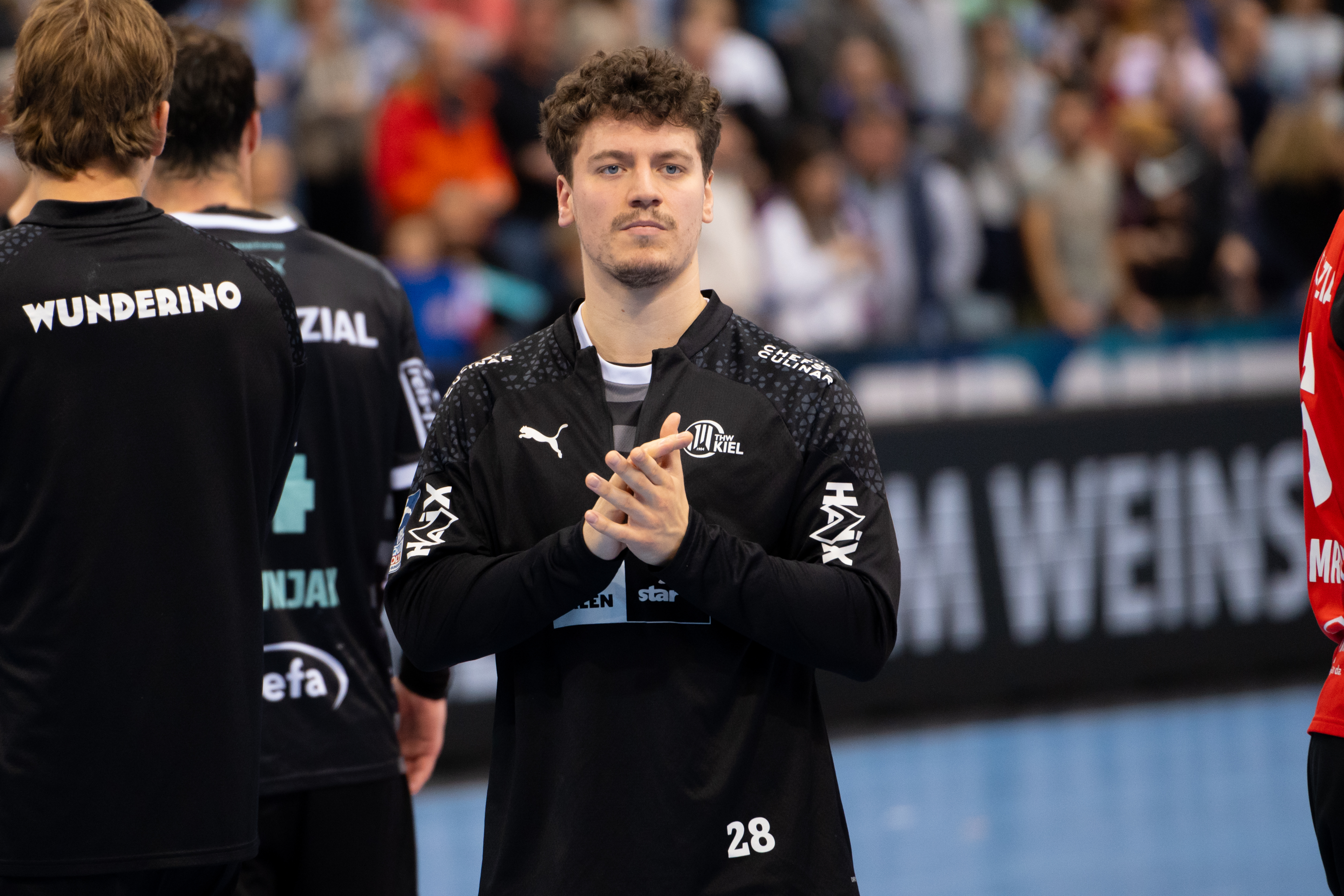
- Elias á Skipagøtu with THW Kiel in 2023

Personal information
- Full name: Elias Ellefsen á Skipagøtu
- Nationality: Faroese
- Born: 19 May 2002 (age 24) Copenhagen, Denmark
- Height: 1.85 m (6 ft 1 in)

Sport
- Sport: Handball
- Position: Centre back
- Current club: THW Kiel
- Number: 71

Youth career
- Years: Team
- 2017–2018: H71
- 2018–2019: Skanderborg Håndbold

Senior clubs
- Years: Team
- 2019–2020: H71
- 2020–2023: IK Sävehof
- 2023–: THW Kiel
National team
Years	Team	Apps	(Gls)
2021–	Faroe Islands	28	(186)
- Updated on 14 January 2026

Elias Ellefsen á Skipagøtu (born 19 May 2002) is a Faroese handball player for THW Kiel and the Faroese national team.

He participated at the 2022 European Under-20 Championship and the 2023 Junior World Championship.

He is the cousin of fellow handballers Oli and Jana Mittún. His brother, Rói Ellefsen á Skipagøtu, is also a handballer.

He was part of the Faroese team at their first ever major international tournament; the 2024 European Men's Handball Championship. They did however exit in the preliminary round after two defeats and one draw.

At the 2026 European Men's Handball Championship he was part of the Faroese team that won their first ever match at a major international tournament, when they won 37–24 against Montenegro.

== Achievements ==
- DHB-Supercup
  - Gold: 2022–23
- DHB-Pokal
  - Gold: 2024-25
- Swedish Handball League
  - Gold: 2020–21
  - Silver: 2022–23
- Swedish Handball Cup
  - Gold: 2021–22
- European Open Handball Championship
  - Gold: 2018–19

Individual Awards

- IHF Young Male Player of the Year 2023
- MVP of Handbollsligan 2021/2022
- All-Star Team as Best centre back of Handbollsligan 2021/2022
- All-Star Team as Best centre back at the 2023 Junior World Championship
- Top scorer at the 2023 Junior World Championship (55 goals)

== Personal life ==
His mother Gunn Ellefsen is the current president of the Handball Federation of the Faroe Islands. His younger brother Rói Ellefsen á Skipagøtu is also a handball player.

He is the cousin of the handball playing siblings of Óli Mittún, Pauli Mittún, and Jana Mittún.

His maternal grandfather was former Faroese Prime Minister, Pauli Ellefsen.
