= David Späth =

German handball player (born 2002)

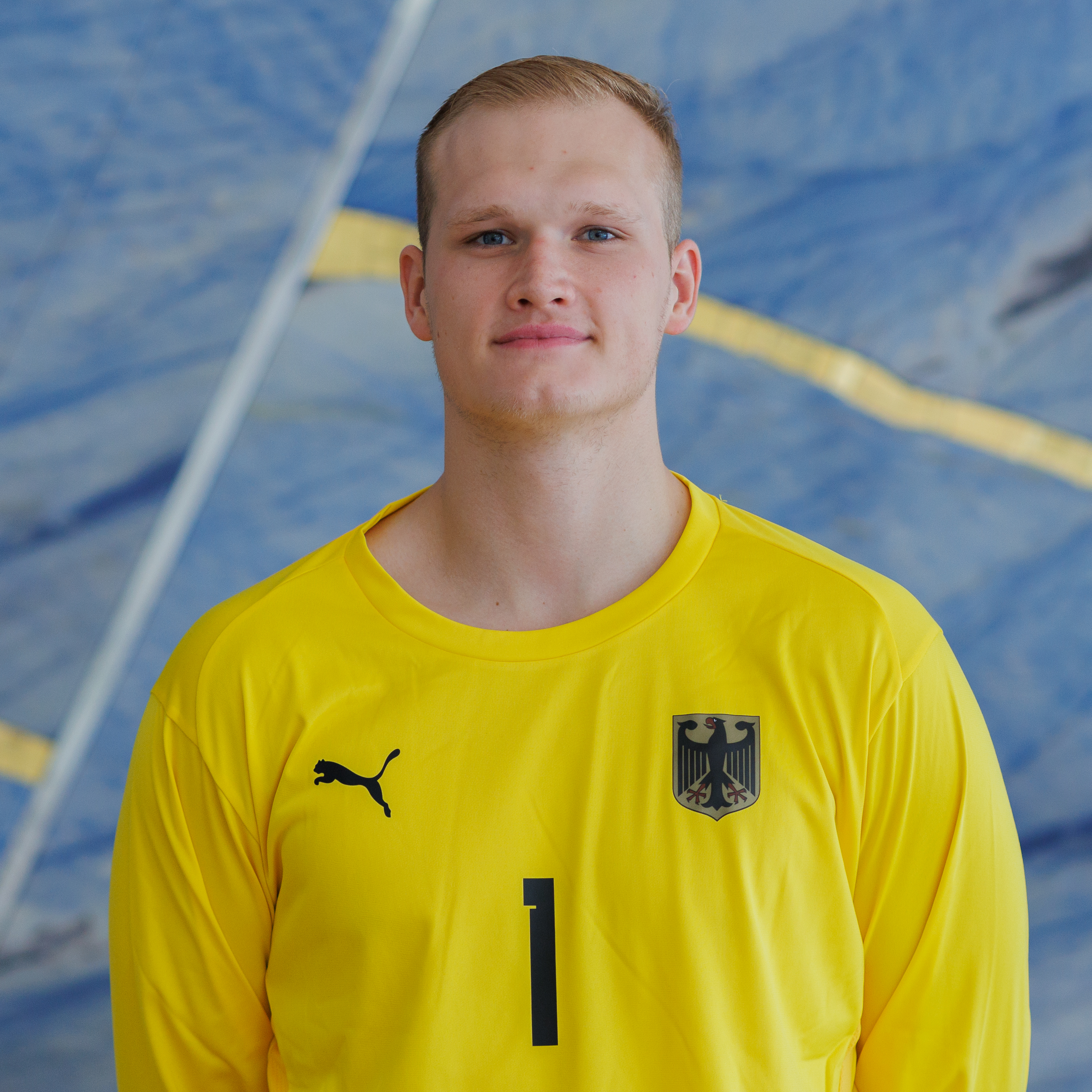
- Späth in 2024

Personal information
- Nationality: German
- Born: 29 April 2002 (age 24) Kaiserslautern, Germany
- Height: 2.02 m (6 ft 8 in)

Sport
- Sport: Handball
- Position: Goalkeeper
- Current club: Rhein-Neckar Löwen
- Number: 29

Senior clubs
- Years: Team
- 2019–: Rhein-Neckar Löwen
National team
Years	Team	Apps	(Gls)
2023–	Germany	60	(3)
Medal record
Olympic Games
Silver medal – second place	2024 Paris	Team
European Championship
Silver medal – second place	2026 Denmark/Norway/Sweden
Junior World Championship
Gold medal – first place	2023 Germany/Greece
European Youth Championship
Gold medal – first place	2021 Croatia
- Updated on 8 November 2026

David Späth (born 29 April 2002) is a German handball player for Rhein-Neckar Löwen and the German national team.

== Club career ==
Having begun his handball career at the age of six, Späth played for a variety of teams based in his hometown of Kaiserslautern, before joining the under-19 team of Bundesliga team Rhein-Neckar Löwen in 2018, where he finished second in the German A-Jugend (age group) championship in his debut season. As a result of injuries sustained by Andreas Palicka and Mikael Appelgren, the main team's goalkeepers, Späth made 26 appearances in the 2020–21 Bundesliga season, earning praise for performing well despite his inexperience. He also made his international club debut in the EHF European League, a competition which the team ended in third place.

The following year, Späth continued playing for both the main team and the reserve squad until November, when a collision with the goal post caused him to sustain an ACL injury which prevented him from playing for almost a year. He made his return at the back end of 2022 in a game against HSV Hamburg. Having fought his way into the position as starting goalkeeper, Späth played a large role in clinching the 2023 DHB-Pokal, saving three seven-meter throws in what he called the "biggest moment of [his] career" to date. Späth signed a contract extension that summer, one that would keep him at the club until 2027.

== International career ==
Späth represented Germany at the 2021 European U-19 Championship, where Germany won gold. He was chosen for the All-Star team as Best goalkeeper. He also participated at the 2023 Junior World Championship where Germany won gold again, and he was once again in the All-Star team.

He debuted for the German national team in November 2023 against Egypt, and was selected for the team for the 2024 European Men's Handball Championship. Späth came into the tournament in the role of backup keeper to Andreas Wolff, a European Champion and mentor to the eleven-years younger Späth. The debutant shone through in a group stage match against North Macedonia, where a string of saves and Späth's impassioned celebrations made headlines. The team finished fourth, with Späth having a save percentage of 28% compared to Wolff's 35%.

At the 2026 European Men's Handball Championship he won silver medals, losing to Denmark in the final. He acted mainly as a back-up to Andreas Wolff.

== Individual awards ==
- All-Star Team as Best goalkeeper at the 2021 European U-19 Championship
- All-Star Team as Best goalkeeper at the 2023 Junior World Championship
