= Torneo Cuatro Naciones de Handball 2023 =

Friendly handball tournament organised by the Argentinean Handball Confederation

2023 Torneo Cuatro Naciones de Handball
Tournament details
- Host country: Argentina
- Venue(s): 1 (in 1 host city)
- Dates: 18–20 June
- Teams: 4 (from 2 confederations)

Final positions
- Champions: Argentina
- Runners-up: Cuba
- Third place: Uruguay
- Fourth place: Puerto Rico

Tournament statistics
- Matches played: 6
- Goals scored: 317 (52.83 per match)
- Top scorer(s): (Uruguay) Faustino Martin (20 goals)

The Torneo Cuatro Naciones de Handball 2023, (2023 Four Nations Handball Tournament in Spanish) held in Buenos Aires Argentina, at La Casa del Handball Argentino between 18 and 20 June was a friendly handball tournament organised by the Argentine Handball Confederation.

== Results ==
Team	Pld	W	D	L	GF	GA	GD	Pts
Argentina	3	3	0	0	106	55	+51	6
Cuba	3	1	1	1	81	74	+7	3
Uruguay	3	1	1	1	71	83	–12	3
Puerto Rico	3	0	0	3	59	105	–46	0

== Round robin ==
All times are local (UTC−03:00).

June 18; 18:30	Uruguay	26–26	Cuba	La Casa del Handball Argentino, Buenos Aires
June 18; 18:30	Martin 10	(13–11)	Toledano, Cordies 5	La Casa del Handball Argentino, Buenos Aires
June 18; 18:30	2× (suspension)	Report	1× (yellow card) 5× (suspension)	La Casa del Handball Argentino, Buenos Aires

June 18; 21:00	Argentina	47–13	Puerto Rico	La Casa del Handball Argentino, Buenos Aires
June 18; 21:00	Pizarro 9	(22–6)	Brito 4	La Casa del Handball Argentino, Buenos Aires
June 18; 21:00	1× (yellow card) 1× (suspension)	Report	4× (suspension)	La Casa del Handball Argentino, Buenos Aires

June 19; 18:30	Cuba	31–21	Puerto Rico	La Casa del Handball Argentino, Buenos Aires
June 19; 18:30	Toledano 6	(17–10)	Brito, Monge 5	La Casa del Handball Argentino, Buenos Aires
June 19; 18:30	2× (yellow card) 4× (suspension)	Report	4× (suspension) 1× (red card)	La Casa del Handball Argentino, Buenos Aires

June 19; 21:00	Argentina	32–18	Uruguay	La Casa del Handball Argentino, Buenos Aires
June 19; 21:00	Baronetto 7	(12–9)	Martin 6	La Casa del Handball Argentino, Buenos Aires
June 19; 21:00	3× (suspension)	Report	1× (yellow card) 1× (suspension)	La Casa del Handball Argentino, Buenos Aires

June 20; 18:30	Uruguay	27–25	Puerto Rico	La Casa del Handball Argentino, Buenos Aires
June 20; 18:30	Lima 7	(11–10)	Fraguada 8	La Casa del Handball Argentino, Buenos Aires
June 20; 18:30	1× (yellow card) 2× (suspension)	Report	5× (suspension)	La Casa del Handball Argentino, Buenos Aires

June 20; 21:00	Argentina	27–24	Cuba	La Casa del Handball Argentino, Buenos Aires
June 20; 21:00	Pizarro 4	(10–10)	Garcia 7	La Casa del Handball Argentino, Buenos Aires
June 20; 21:00	1× (yellow card) 1× (suspension)	Report	1× (yellow card) 5× (suspension)	La Casa del Handball Argentino, Buenos Aires

== Final standing ==
Rank	Team
Gold medal	Argentina
2	Cuba
3	Uruguay
4	Puerto Rico
