= 2022 South and Central American Men's Junior Handball Championship =

Tournament details
- Host country: Argentina
- Venue(s): 1 (in 1 host city)
- Dates: 8–12 November
- Teams: 8 (from 1 confederation)

Final positions
- Champions: Brazil (1st title)
- Runners-up: Argentina
- Third place: Chile
- Fourth place: Costa Rica

Tournament statistics
- Matches played: 20
- Goals scored: 1,012 (50.6 per match)
- Attendance: 10,090 (505 per match)

The 2022 South and Central American Men's Junior Handball Championship took place in Buenos Aires, Argentina at the La Casa del Handball Argentino, from 8 to 12 November 2022. It acted as the South and Central American qualifying tournament for the 2023 Men's Junior World Handball Championship. The tournament also serves as a qualification event for the Intercontinental Phase of the IHF Trophy.

== Preliminary round ==
All times are local (UTC–3).

=== Group A ===
Pos	Team	Pld	W	D	L	GF	GA	GD	Pts	Qualification
1	Argentina (H)	3	3	0	0	117	44	+73	6	Semifinals
2	Chile	3	2	0	1	70	65	+5	4	Semifinals
3	French Guiana	3	1	0	2	63	87	−24	2	5–8th place semifinals
4	Guatemala	3	0	0	3	45	99	−54	0	5–8th place semifinals

Source: torneoscoscabal.com
Rules for classification: 1) Points; 2) Head-to-head points; 3) Head-to-head goal difference; 4) Head-to-head goals scored; 5) Goal difference; 6) Goals scored; 7) Draw.
(H) Hosts

8 November 2022; 14:00	Chile	31–11	Guatemala	La Casa del Handball Argentino, Buenos Aires; Attendance: 50
8 November 2022; 14:00		(17–5)		La Casa del Handball Argentino, Buenos Aires; Attendance: 50
8 November 2022; 14:00		Report		La Casa del Handball Argentino, Buenos Aires; Attendance: 50

8 November 2022; 21:00	Argentina	39–19	French Guiana	La Casa del Handball Argentino, Buenos Aires; Attendance: 1,000; Referees: Araújo, Perdomo (URU)
8 November 2022; 21:00	Robledo 9	(21–12)	Boisne-Noc 5	La Casa del Handball Argentino, Buenos Aires; Attendance: 1,000; Referees: Araújo, Perdomo (URU)
8 November 2022; 21:00	4× (suspension)	Report	1× (yellow card) 2× (suspension) 2× (red card)	La Casa del Handball Argentino, Buenos Aires; Attendance: 1,000; Referees: Araújo, Perdomo (URU)

9 November 2022; 14:00	French Guiana	19–26	Chile	La Casa del Handball Argentino, Buenos Aires; Attendance: 150
9 November 2022; 14:00		(12–11)		La Casa del Handball Argentino, Buenos Aires; Attendance: 150
9 November 2022; 14:00		Report		La Casa del Handball Argentino, Buenos Aires; Attendance: 150

9 November 2022; 21:00	Guatemala	12–43	Argentina	La Casa del Handball Argentino, Buenos Aires; Attendance: 300; Referees: Alvarado, Castillo (CRC)
9 November 2022; 21:00	Flores 4	(6–24)	Garay, Robledo 7	La Casa del Handball Argentino, Buenos Aires; Attendance: 300; Referees: Alvarado, Castillo (CRC)
9 November 2022; 21:00	3× (suspension)	Report	1× (suspension)	La Casa del Handball Argentino, Buenos Aires; Attendance: 300; Referees: Alvarado, Castillo (CRC)

10 November 2022; 10:30	French Guiana	25–22	Guatemala	La Casa del Handball Argentino, Buenos Aires; Attendance: 60
10 November 2022; 10:30		(16–12)		La Casa del Handball Argentino, Buenos Aires; Attendance: 60
10 November 2022; 10:30		Report		La Casa del Handball Argentino, Buenos Aires; Attendance: 60

10 November 2022; 21:00	Argentina	35–13	Chile	La Casa del Handball Argentino, Buenos Aires; Attendance: 1,100; Referees: Lenzue, Burgos (URU)
10 November 2022; 21:00	Benacedo, Robledo 6	(19–10)	Scaramelli 4	La Casa del Handball Argentino, Buenos Aires; Attendance: 1,100; Referees: Lenzue, Burgos (URU)
10 November 2022; 21:00	1× (yellow card) 2× (suspension)	Report	3× (suspension)	La Casa del Handball Argentino, Buenos Aires; Attendance: 1,100; Referees: Lenzue, Burgos (URU)

=== Group B ===
Pos	Team	Pld	W	D	L	GF	GA	GD	Pts	Qualification
1	Brazil	3	3	0	0	108	54	+54	6	Semifinals
2	Costa Rica	3	2	0	1	74	84	−10	4	Semifinals
3	Uruguay	3	1	0	2	75	85	−10	2	5–8th place semifinals
4	Paraguay	3	0	0	3	59	93	−34	0	5–8th place semifinals

Source: torneoscoscabal.com
Rules for classification: 1) Points; 2) Head-to-head points; 3) Head-to-head goal difference; 4) Head-to-head goals scored; 5) Goal difference; 6) Goals scored; 7) Draw.

8 November 2022; 10:30	Uruguay	28–24	Paraguay	La Casa del Handball Argentino, Buenos Aires; Attendance: 345
8 November 2022; 10:30		(12–13)		La Casa del Handball Argentino, Buenos Aires; Attendance: 345
8 November 2022; 10:30		Report		La Casa del Handball Argentino, Buenos Aires; Attendance: 345

8 November 2022; 17:30	Brazil	40–16	Costa Rica	La Casa del Handball Argentino, Buenos Aires; Attendance: 200
8 November 2022; 17:30		(24–8)		La Casa del Handball Argentino, Buenos Aires; Attendance: 200
8 November 2022; 17:30		Report		La Casa del Handball Argentino, Buenos Aires; Attendance: 200

9 November 2022; 10:30	Paraguay	13–36	Brazil	La Casa del Handball Argentino, Buenos Aires; Attendance: 100
9 November 2022; 10:30		(8–15)		La Casa del Handball Argentino, Buenos Aires; Attendance: 100
9 November 2022; 10:30		Report		La Casa del Handball Argentino, Buenos Aires; Attendance: 100

9 November 2022; 17:30	Costa Rica	29–22	Uruguay	La Casa del Handball Argentino, Buenos Aires; Attendance: 200
9 November 2022; 17:30		(11–11)		La Casa del Handball Argentino, Buenos Aires; Attendance: 200
9 November 2022; 17:30		Report		La Casa del Handball Argentino, Buenos Aires; Attendance: 200

10 November 2022; 14:00	Costa Rica	29–22	Paraguay	La Casa del Handball Argentino, Buenos Aires; Attendance: 190
10 November 2022; 14:00		(12–9)		La Casa del Handball Argentino, Buenos Aires; Attendance: 190
10 November 2022; 14:00		Report		La Casa del Handball Argentino, Buenos Aires; Attendance: 190

10 November 2022; 17:30	Brazil	32–25	Uruguay	La Casa del Handball Argentino, Buenos Aires; Attendance: 300
10 November 2022; 17:30		(14–13)		La Casa del Handball Argentino, Buenos Aires; Attendance: 300
10 November 2022; 17:30		Report		La Casa del Handball Argentino, Buenos Aires; Attendance: 300

== Knockout stage ==
=== Bracket ===
Semi-finals
11 November
Argentina	40
Costa Rica	11
11 November
Brazil	27
Chile	17

Final
12 November
Argentina	25
Brazil	27
Third place
12 November
Costa Rica	15
Chile	26

5–8th place bracket

5–8th place semifinals
11 November
French Guiana	25
Paraguay	27
11 November
Uruguay	29
Guatemala	25

Fifth place
12 November
Paraguay	23
Uruguay	30
Seventh place
12 November
French Guiana	30
Guatemala	24

=== 5–8th place semifinals ===
11 November 2022; 10:30	French Guiana	25–27	Paraguay	La Casa del Handball Argentino, Buenos Aires; Attendance: 400
11 November 2022; 10:30		(11–14)		La Casa del Handball Argentino, Buenos Aires; Attendance: 400
11 November 2022; 10:30		Report		La Casa del Handball Argentino, Buenos Aires; Attendance: 400

11 November 2022; 14:00	Uruguay	29–25	Guatemala	La Casa del Handball Argentino, Buenos Aires; Attendance: 200
11 November 2022; 14:00		(17–12)		La Casa del Handball Argentino, Buenos Aires; Attendance: 200
11 November 2022; 14:00		Report		La Casa del Handball Argentino, Buenos Aires; Attendance: 200

=== Semifinals ===
11 November 2022; 17:30	Brazil	27–17	Chile	La Casa del Handball Argentino, Buenos Aires; Attendance: 400
11 November 2022; 17:30		(13–8)		La Casa del Handball Argentino, Buenos Aires; Attendance: 400
11 November 2022; 17:30		Report		La Casa del Handball Argentino, Buenos Aires; Attendance: 400

11 November 2022; 21:00	Argentina	40–11	Costa Rica	La Casa del Handball Argentino, Buenos Aires; Attendance: 1,350; Referees: Corrêa, Corrêa (BRA)
11 November 2022; 21:00	Reynaldo 6	(21–6)	Cantarero, Suárez 4	La Casa del Handball Argentino, Buenos Aires; Attendance: 1,350; Referees: Corrêa, Corrêa (BRA)
11 November 2022; 21:00	2× (suspension) 1× (red card)	Report	4× (suspension)	La Casa del Handball Argentino, Buenos Aires; Attendance: 1,350; Referees: Corrêa, Corrêa (BRA)

=== Seventh place game ===
12 November 2022; 10:30	French Guiana	30–24	Guatemala	La Casa del Handball Argentino, Buenos Aires; Attendance: 45
12 November 2022; 10:30		(17–12)		La Casa del Handball Argentino, Buenos Aires; Attendance: 45
12 November 2022; 10:30		Report		La Casa del Handball Argentino, Buenos Aires; Attendance: 45

=== Fifth place game ===
12 November 2022; 14:00	Paraguay	23–30	Uruguay	La Casa del Handball Argentino, Buenos Aires; Attendance: 100
12 November 2022; 14:00		(9–14)		La Casa del Handball Argentino, Buenos Aires; Attendance: 100
12 November 2022; 14:00		Report		La Casa del Handball Argentino, Buenos Aires; Attendance: 100

=== Third place game ===
12 November 2022; 17:30	Costa Rica	15–26	Chile	La Casa del Handball Argentino, Buenos Aires; Attendance: 600
12 November 2022; 17:30		(9–10)		La Casa del Handball Argentino, Buenos Aires; Attendance: 600
12 November 2022; 17:30		Report		La Casa del Handball Argentino, Buenos Aires; Attendance: 600

=== Final ===
12 November 2022; 21:00	Argentina	25–27	Brazil	La Casa del Handball Argentino, Buenos Aires; Attendance: 3,000; Referees: Sosa, Lemes (URU)
12 November 2022; 21:00	Barceló, Jung 5	(14–14)	Monte 6	La Casa del Handball Argentino, Buenos Aires; Attendance: 3,000; Referees: Sosa, Lemes (URU)
12 November 2022; 21:00	2× (yellow card) 3× (suspension)	Report	1× (yellow card) 1× (suspension) 1× (red card)	La Casa del Handball Argentino, Buenos Aires; Attendance: 3,000; Referees: Sosa, Lemes (URU)

== Final standing ==
Rank	Team
1st place, gold medalist(s)	Brazil
2nd place, silver medalist(s)	Argentina
3rd place, bronze medalist(s)	Chile
4	Costa Rica
5	Uruguay
6	Paraguay
7	French Guiana
8	Guatemala

Qualified for the 2023 Men's Junior World Championship
Qualified for the 2023 Men's Junior World Championship and the 2023 IHF Inter-Continental Trophy

2022 South and Central American Men's Junior Champions

Brazil men's national junior handball team
First title

Team roster: Ruan Pablo da Silva Almeida, Cauê Silva Martins de Souza, Giancarlo Felipe Henn, Erick Silva Santana, Gabriel Cardoso Griggio, Luiz Felipe Araújo Vieira, Gabriel Josepetti da Costa, Gabriel dos Santos Rosa, Samir Oliveira Froes, João Vítor Rosso, Pedro Sosa Daitx, Felipe Condeixa Kerber, Bryan Monte, Matheus Henrique Frias, Willian da Silva Santos, Juan Sebastião Marcos.
Head coach: Drean Farencena.
