= La Casa del Handball Argentino =

Sporting arena in Buenos Aires

- Interactive map of La Casa del Handball Argentino
- Location: Villa Soldati, Buenos Aires, Argentina
- Coordinates: 34°40′34″S 58°26′25″W
- Owner: Argentine Handball Confederation
- Capacity: 3,300

Construction
- Opened: 28 October 2022

Tenants
- Argentina men's national handball team Argentina women's national handball team

La Casa del Handball Argentino (English: Home of Argentine Handball) is an arena in Villa Soldati, Buenos Aires, Argentina, belonging to Argentine Handball Confederation. The venue was opened in October 2022 and seats up to 5000 spectators. It was built to be the Oceania Pavilion of the Youth Olympic Park, home of the Boxing and Taekwondo competitions of the 2018 Youth Olympics.

== Competitions hosted ==
- 2022 South and Central American Men's Youth Handball Championship
- 2022 South and Central American Men's Junior Handball Championship
- 2023 South and Central American Women's Youth Handball Championship
- 2023 South and Central American Women's Junior Handball Championship
- Torneo Cuatro Naciones de Handball 2023
- 2024 South and Central American Men's Handball Championship
