= Argentina men's national junior handball team =

Handball team

Argentina

Information
- Association: Argentina Handball Federation

Colours
1st	2nd

Results

IHF U-21 World Championship
- Appearances: 14 (First in 1993)
- Best result: 6th place : (2009)
- Last updated on Unknown.

The Argentina national junior handball team is the national under-20 handball team of Argentina. Controlled by the Argentine Handball Confederation, that is an affiliate of the International Handball Federation and also a part of the South and Central America Handball Confederation, the team represents the country in international matches.

== Statistics ==
=== IHF Junior World Championship record ===
Champions Runners up Third place Fourth place

Year	Round	Position	GP	W	D	L	GS	GA	GD
1977 (Sweden)	Didn't Qualify								
1979 (Denmark) (Sweden)	Didn't Qualify								
1981 (Portugal)	Didn't Qualify								
1983 (Finland)	Didn't Qualify								
1985 (Italy)	Didn't Qualify								
1987 (Socialist Federal Republic of Yugoslavia)	Didn't Qualify								
1989 (Spain)	Didn't Qualify								
1991 (Greece)	Didn't Qualify								
1993 (Egypt)		11th place							
1995 (Argentina)		17th place							
1997 (Turkey)	Didn't Qualify								
1999 (Qatar)	Didn't Qualify								
2001 (Switzerland)		20th place							
2003 (Brazil)		16th place							
2005 (Hungary)		11th place							
2007 (North Macedonia)		13th place							
2009 (Egypt)		6th place							
2011 (Greece)		20th place							
2013 (Bosnia and Herzegovina)		16th place							
2015 (Brazil)		13th place							
2017 (Algeria)		13th place							
2019 (Spain)		21st place							
2023 (Germany) (Greece)		25th place							
2025 (Poland)		23rd place							
Total	14/24	0 Titles							

=== Junior South and Central American Championship record ===
Champions Runners up Third place Fourth place

Year	Round	Position	GP	W	D	L	GS	GA	GD
(Colombia) 2019	Round robin	Champion	5	5	0	0	132	87	45
(Argentina) 2022	Final	Runner up	5	4	0	1	182	82	100
(Nicaragua) 2024	Final	Champion	5	5	0	0	157	96	61
Total	3/3	2 Titles	15	14	0	1	471	265	206
