= Brazil men's national junior handball team =

Brazil

Information
- Association: Brazil Handball Federation

Colours
1st	2nd

Results

IHF U-21 World Championship
- Appearances: 16 (First in 1991)
- Best result: 6th place : (2013)
- Last updated on Unknown.

The Brazil national junior handball team is the national under-20 handball team of Brazil. Controlled by the Brazilian Handball Confederation, that is an affiliate of the International Handball Federation IHF and also a part of the South and Central America Handball Confederation SCAHC. The team represents the country in international matches.

== Statistics ==
=== IHF Junior World Championship record ===
Champions Runners up Third place Fourth place

Year	Round	Position	GP	W	D	L	GS	GA	GD
1977 (Sweden)	Didn't Qualify								
1979 (Denmark) (Sweden)	Didn't Qualify								
1981 (Portugal)	Didn't Qualify								
1983 (Finland)	Didn't Qualify								
1985 (Italy)	Didn't Qualify								
1987 (Socialist Federal Republic of Yugoslavia)	Didn't Qualify								
1989 (Spain)	Didn't Qualify								
1991 (Greece)	Placement matches	15th place	6	1	0	5	144	161	-17
1993 (Egypt)	Didn't Qualify								
1995 (Argentina)	Placement matches	17th place	5	0	0	5	91	130	-39
1997 (Turkey)	Round of 16	16th place	6	2	1	3	141	148	-7
1999 (Qatar)	Placement matches	13th place	7	3	1	3	183	149	34
2001 (Switzerland)	Placement matches	11th place	8	3	0	5	204	202	2
2003 (Brazil)	Placement matches	8th place	8	4	0	4	178	189	-13
2005 (Hungary)	Placement matches	16th place	8	3	0	5	219	231	-12
2007 (North Macedonia)	Placement matches	16th place	8	3	0	5	261	250	9
2009 (Egypt)	Placement matches	9th place	9	5	0	4	254	243	11
2011 (Greece)	Placement matches	11th place	9	4	0	5	237	252	-15
2013 (Bosnia and Herzegovina)	Placement matches	6th place	9	4	0	5	220	226	-6
2015 (Brazil)	Placement matches	10th place	7	3	1	3	221	201	20
2017 (Algeria)	President's Cup	18th place	7	3	0	4	205	184	21
2019 (Spain)	Placement matches	12th place	7	4	0	3	216	202	14
2023 (Germany) (Greece)	Placement matches	16th place	7	2	0	5	179	194	-15
2025 (Poland)	Placement matches	27th place	5	2	0	3	148	139	9
Total	16/24	0 Titles	116	46	3	67	3101	3101	0

=== Junior Pan American Championship record ===
Champions Runners up Third place Fourth place

Year	Round	Position	GP	W	D	L	GS	GA	GD
(Brazil) 1993	Round robin	Runner up							
(Brazil) 1997	Final	Champion	5	5	0	0	152	78	74
(Puerto Rico) 1999	Final	Champion	4	4	0	0	105	55	50
(United States) 2001	Final	Champion	5	5	0	0	154	87	67
(Chile) 2002	Round robin	Runner up	5	4	1	0	156	109	47
(Argentina) 2005	Round robin	Runner up	5	4	0	1	185	119	66
(Chile) 2007	Final	Runner up	5	4	0	1	186	105	81
(Argentina) 2009	Round robin	Runner up	5	4	0	1	173	114	59
(Brazil) 2011	Round robin	Runner up	4	3	0	1	130	183	47
(Argentina) 2013	Final	Champion	6	6	0	0	226	119	127
(Brazil) 2015	Round robin	Champion	5	5	0	0	191	94	97
(Paraguay) 2017	Final	Champion	4	4	0	0	148	88	60

=== Junior South and Central American Championship record ===
Champions Runners up Third place Fourth place

Year	Round	Position	GP	W	D	L	GS	GA	GD
(Colombia) 2019	Round robin	Runner up	5	4	0	1	198	96	102
(Argentina) 2022	Final	Champion	5	5	0	0	162	96	66
(Nicaragua) 2024	Final	Runner up	5	4	0	1	166	102	64
Total	3/3	1 Title	15	13	0	2	526	294	232
