= Swiss Life Hall =

Indoor arena in Germany

Coordinates: 52°21′25″N 9°43′47.9″E

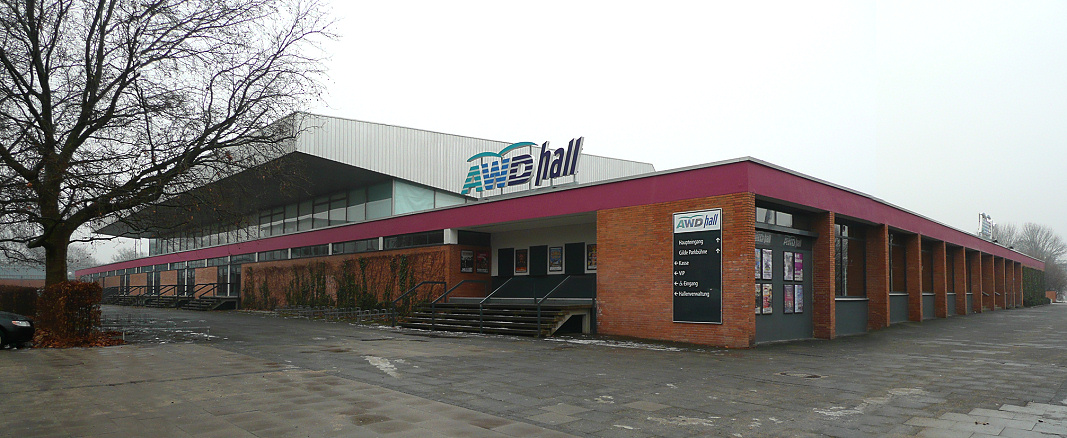
AWD Hall

Swiss Life Hall (formerly AWD Hall and Stadionsporthalle) is an indoor arena, in Hanover, Germany. The hall can hold 5,500 people and is sponsored by the Swiss Life insurance company.

It mainly hosts indoor sporting events, concerts and trade shows. On 6 May 2001, Irish vocal pop band Westlife held a concert for their Where Dreams Come True Tour supporting their album Coast to Coast.
