= Þorsteinn Leó Gunnarsson =

Icelandic handball player (born 2002)

Personal information
- Nationality: Icelandic
- Born: 13 November 2002 (age 23) Mosfellsbær, Iceland
- Height: 2.08 m (6 ft 10 in)

Sport
- Sport: Handball
- Position: Left back
- Current club: FC Porto
- Number: 5

Youth career
- Years: Team
- –2020: Afturelding

Senior clubs
- Years: Team
- 2020–2024: Afturelding
- 2024–: FC Porto
National team
Years	Team	Apps	(Gls)
2023–	Iceland	17	(37)

Þorsteinn Leó Gunnarsson (born 13 November 2002) is an Icelandic handball player for FC Porto and the Icelandic national team.

He represented Iceland at the 2025 World Men's Handball Championship.

== Personal life ==
Þorsteinn's sister is Erna Sóley Gunnarsdóttir, the first female shot putter to represent Iceland at the Olympic Games.
