= 2019 South and Central American Men's Junior Handball Championship =

Tournament details
- Host country: Colombia
- Venue: 1 (in 1 host city)
- Dates: 3–7 April
- Teams: 6 (from 1 confederation)

Final positions
- Champions: Argentina (1st title)
- Runners-up: Brazil
- Third place: Chile
- Fourth place: Venezuela

Tournament statistics
- Top scorers: (Brazil) Guilherme Torriani (32 goals)

The 2019 South and Central American Men's Junior Handball Championship was the first edition of the tournament, took place in Palmira, Colombia at the Pabellon Blanco, from 3 to 7 April 2019. It acted as the South and Central American qualifying tournament for the 2019 Men's Junior World Handball Championship.

== Standings ==
Pos	Team	Pld	W	D	L	GF	GA	GD	Pts	Qualification
1st place, gold medalist(s)	Argentina	5	5	0	0	132	87	+45	10	2019 Men's Junior World Handball Championship
2nd place, silver medalist(s)	Brazil	5	4	0	1	198	96	+102	8	2019 Men's Junior World Handball Championship
3rd place, bronze medalist(s)	Chile	5	3	0	2	149	132	+17	6	2019 Men's Junior World Handball Championship
4	Venezuela	5	2	0	3	91	149	−58	4	
5	Colombia (H)	5	1	0	4	128	169	−41	2	
6	Paraguay	5	0	0	5	122	187	−65	0	

Rules for classification: 1) Points; 2) Head-to-head points; 3) Head-to-head goal difference; 4) Head-to-head goals scored; 5) Goal difference; 6) Goals scored; 7) Draw.
(H) Hosts

== Results ==
All times are local (UTC–5).

3 April 2019; 16:00	Chile	31–24	Colombia	Pabellon Blanco, Palmira
3 April 2019; 16:00		(–)		Pabellon Blanco, Palmira

3 April 2019; 18:00	Brazil	44–16	Paraguay	Pabellon Blanco, Palmira
3 April 2019; 18:00		(23–3)		Pabellon Blanco, Palmira

3 April 2019; 20:00	Argentina	10–0; Forfeit	Venezuela	Pabellon Blanco, Palmira

4 April 2019; 16:00	Colombia	17–52	Brazil	Pabellon Blanco, Palmira
4 April 2019; 16:00		(6–27)		Pabellon Blanco, Palmira

4 April 2019; 18:00	Paraguay	14–37	Argentina	Pabellon Blanco, Palmira; Attendance: 150; Referees: Estrada, Pineda (COL)
4 April 2019; 18:00	Gómez, Melgarejo 4	(6–19)	Flores, Sanfelippo 5	Pabellon Blanco, Palmira; Attendance: 150; Referees: Estrada, Pineda (COL)
4 April 2019; 18:00	1× (yellow card) 3× (suspension)	Report	2× (yellow card) 1× (suspension)	Pabellon Blanco, Palmira; Attendance: 150; Referees: Estrada, Pineda (COL)

4 April 2019; 20:00	Venezuela	18–38	Chile	Pabellon Blanco, Palmira
4 April 2019; 20:00		(10–19)		Pabellon Blanco, Palmira

5 April 2019; 16:00	Paraguay	30–39	Colombia	Pabellon Blanco, Palmira
5 April 2019; 16:00		(13–14)		Pabellon Blanco, Palmira

5 April 2019; 18:00	Argentina	28–24	Chile	Pabellon Blanco, Palmira; Attendance: 350; Referees: Lemes, Sosa (URU)
5 April 2019; 18:00	Martínez, Peguri 5	(13–13)	three players 5	Pabellon Blanco, Palmira; Attendance: 350; Referees: Lemes, Sosa (URU)
5 April 2019; 18:00	3× (yellow card) 5× (suspension)	Report	2× (yellow card) 6× (suspension) 1× (red card)	Pabellon Blanco, Palmira; Attendance: 350; Referees: Lemes, Sosa (URU)

5 April 2019; 20:00	Brazil	46–16	Venezuela	Pabellon Blanco, Palmira
5 April 2019; 20:00		(23–7)		Pabellon Blanco, Palmira

6 April 2019; 16:00	Argentina	31–24	Colombia	Pabellon Blanco, Palmira; Attendance: 200; Referees: Lemes, Sosa (URU)
6 April 2019; 16:00	López 11	(13–13)	Bedoya 9	Pabellon Blanco, Palmira; Attendance: 200; Referees: Lemes, Sosa (URU)
6 April 2019; 16:00	2× (yellow card) 4× (suspension) 1× (red card)	Report	1× (yellow card) 1× (suspension) 2× (red card)	Pabellon Blanco, Palmira; Attendance: 200; Referees: Lemes, Sosa (URU)

6 April 2019; 18:00	Venezuela	32–31	Paraguay	Pabellon Blanco, Palmira
6 April 2019; 18:00		(16–17)		Pabellon Blanco, Palmira

6 April 2019; 20:00	Chile	21–31	Brazil	Pabellon Blanco, Palmira
6 April 2019; 20:00		(13–16)		Pabellon Blanco, Palmira

7 April 2019; 16:00	Colombia	24–25	Venezuela	Pabellon Blanco, Palmira
7 April 2019; 16:00		(12–11)		Pabellon Blanco, Palmira

7 April 2019; 18:00	Chile	35–31	Paraguay	Pabellon Blanco, Palmira
7 April 2019; 18:00		(16–12)		Pabellon Blanco, Palmira

7 April 2019; 20:00	Brazil	25–26	Argentina	Pabellon Blanco, Palmira; Attendance: 350; Referees: Lemes, Sosa (URU)
7 April 2019; 20:00	Torriani 7	(14–17)	López 7	Pabellon Blanco, Palmira; Attendance: 350; Referees: Lemes, Sosa (URU)
7 April 2019; 20:00	1× (yellow card) 5× (suspension)	Report	4× (yellow card) 5× (suspension)	Pabellon Blanco, Palmira; Attendance: 350; Referees: Lemes, Sosa (URU)
