= 2019 Men's Junior World Handball Championship =

Tournament details
- Host country: Spain
- Venue(s): 2 (in 2 host cities)
- Dates: 16–28 July
- Teams: 24 (from 6 confederations)

Final positions
- Champions: France (2nd title)
- Runner-up: Croatia
- Third place: Egypt
- Fourth place: Portugal

Tournament statistics
- Matches played: 92
- Goals scored: 5,262 (57.2 per match)
- Top scorer(s): (Portugal) Diogo Silva (76 goals)

Awards
- Best player: (Croatia) Ivan Martinović

The 2019 IHF Men's Junior World Championship (under-21) was the 22nd edition of the tournament, held from 16 to 28 July 2019 in Vigo and Pontevedra, Spain. It was the second time that Spain stage the competition, and the fifteenth time that it was held in Europe.

France secured their second title after defeating Croatia in the final.

== Qualified teams ==
Competition	Dates	Vacancies	Qualified
Host nation		1	Spain
2017 Men's Youth World Handball Championship	8–20 August 2017	1	France
IHF Trophy – Oceania	10–15 June 2018	1	Australia
2018 Asian Men's Junior Handball Championship	16–26 July 2018	3	South Korea; Japan; Bahrain
2018 European Men's Under-20 Handball Championship	19–29 July 2018	9+1	Slovenia; Germany; Portugal; Croatia; Iceland; Serbia; Norway; Sweden; Hungary; Denmark
2018 African Men's Junior Handball Championship	7–14 September 2018	3	Egypt; Tunisia; Nigeria
IHF Trophy – North America & the Caribbean	17–20 November 2018	1	United States
2019 South and Central American Men's Junior Handball Championship	3–7 April 2019	3	Argentina; Brazil; Chile
2019 IHF Inter-Continental Trophy	10–14 April 2019	1	Kosovo

== Draw ==
The draw was held on 21 May 2019 in Pontevedra, Spain.

=== Seedings ===
The seedings were announced on 18 April 2019.

Pot 1	Pot 2	Pot 3	Pot 4	Pot 5	Pot 6
Slovenia; France; Germany; Portugal	Spain; Egypt; Croatia; Iceland	Serbia; Norway; Sweden; Hungary	Argentina; Tunisia; Nigeria; Brazil	South Korea; Japan; Bahrain; Denmark	Chile; Australia; United States; Kosovo

== Preliminary round ==
All times are local (UTC+2).

=== Group A ===
Pos	Team	Pld	W	D	L	GF	GA	GD	Pts	Qualification
1	Slovenia	5	5	0	0	156	112	+44	10	Round of 16
2	Spain (H)	5	4	0	1	138	103	+35	8	Round of 16
3	Tunisia	5	3	0	2	130	129	+1	6	Round of 16
4	Serbia	5	2	0	3	134	126	+8	4	Round of 16
5	Japan	5	1	0	4	109	124	−15	2	
6	United States	5	0	0	5	91	164	−73	0	

Source: IHF
Rules for classification: 1) points; 2) head-to-head points; 3) head-to-head goal difference; 4) head-to-head number of goals scored; 5) goal difference.
(H) Hosts

16 July 2019; 16:30	Slovenia	32–25	Tunisia	Complejo Deportivo de As Travesas, Vigo; Attendance: 150; Referees: Burgos, Delgado (ARG)
16 July 2019; 16:30	Ocvirk 7	(17–14)	Darmoul, Mustapha 6	Complejo Deportivo de As Travesas, Vigo; Attendance: 150; Referees: Burgos, Delgado (ARG)
16 July 2019; 16:30	2× (yellow card) 8× (suspension)	Report	4× (suspension) 1× (red card)	Complejo Deportivo de As Travesas, Vigo; Attendance: 150; Referees: Burgos, Delgado (ARG)

16 July 2019; 18:30	Serbia	21–19	Japan	Complejo Deportivo de As Travesas, Vigo; Attendance: 80; Referees: Marhoon, Al-Mawt (BHR)
16 July 2019; 18:30	Tomić 5	(9–9)	Tokuda 5	Complejo Deportivo de As Travesas, Vigo; Attendance: 80; Referees: Marhoon, Al-Mawt (BHR)
16 July 2019; 18:30	2× (yellow card) 5× (suspension)	Report	1× (yellow card) 3× (suspension)	Complejo Deportivo de As Travesas, Vigo; Attendance: 80; Referees: Marhoon, Al-Mawt (BHR)

16 July 2019; 21:00	Spain	34–13	United States	Pavillón Municipal dos Deportes de Pontevedra, Pontevedra; Referees: Belkhiri, Hamidi (ALG)
16 July 2019; 21:00	Diocou, Pérez Arce 6	(21–5)	Seifert 5	Pavillón Municipal dos Deportes de Pontevedra, Pontevedra; Referees: Belkhiri, Hamidi (ALG)
16 July 2019; 21:00	3× (yellow card) 7× (suspension)	Report	1× (yellow card) 5× (suspension)	Pavillón Municipal dos Deportes de Pontevedra, Pontevedra; Referees: Belkhiri, Hamidi (ALG)

18 July 2019; 17:00	Japan	22–29	Slovenia	Complejo Deportivo de As Travesas, Vigo; Attendance: 250; Referees: Năstase, Stancu (ROU)
18 July 2019; 17:00	Tokuda 5	(12–16)	Horžen 6	Complejo Deportivo de As Travesas, Vigo; Attendance: 250; Referees: Năstase, Stancu (ROU)
18 July 2019; 17:00	1× (yellow card) 2× (suspension)	Report	3× (yellow card) 3× (suspension)	Complejo Deportivo de As Travesas, Vigo; Attendance: 250; Referees: Năstase, Stancu (ROU)

18 July 2019; 19:00	United States	19–36	Serbia	Complejo Deportivo de As Travesas, Vigo; Attendance: 255; Referees: Konjičanin, Konjičanin (BIH)
18 July 2019; 19:00	Klerud 5	(9–13)	Ivanović 10	Complejo Deportivo de As Travesas, Vigo; Attendance: 255; Referees: Konjičanin, Konjičanin (BIH)
18 July 2019; 19:00	1× (yellow card) 6× (suspension)	Report	2× (yellow card) 8× (suspension)	Complejo Deportivo de As Travesas, Vigo; Attendance: 255; Referees: Konjičanin, Konjičanin (BIH)

18 July 2019; 21:00	Tunisia	20–26	Spain	Complejo Deportivo de As Travesas, Vigo; Attendance: 450; Referees: Lončar, Lončar (CRO)
18 July 2019; 21:00	Darmoul 8	(8–15)	Pérez 10	Complejo Deportivo de As Travesas, Vigo; Attendance: 450; Referees: Lončar, Lončar (CRO)
18 July 2019; 21:00	3× (yellow card) 2× (suspension)	Report	2× (yellow card) 2× (suspension)	Complejo Deportivo de As Travesas, Vigo; Attendance: 450; Referees: Lončar, Lončar (CRO)

19 July 2019; 16:30	Tunisia	26–25	Japan	Complejo Deportivo de As Travesas, Vigo; Attendance: 120; Referees: Kulik, Nabokau (BLR)
19 July 2019; 16:30	Mustapha 6	(14–8)	Tokuda 7	Complejo Deportivo de As Travesas, Vigo; Attendance: 120; Referees: Kulik, Nabokau (BLR)
19 July 2019; 16:30	1× (yellow card) 4× (suspension)	Report	2× (yellow card) 6× (suspension)	Complejo Deportivo de As Travesas, Vigo; Attendance: 120; Referees: Kulik, Nabokau (BLR)

19 July 2019; 18:30	Slovenia	43–16	United States	Complejo Deportivo de As Travesas, Vigo; Attendance: 140; Referees: Leszczyński, Piechota (POL)
19 July 2019; 18:30	Horvat 7	(22–6)	Amitovic 4	Complejo Deportivo de As Travesas, Vigo; Attendance: 140; Referees: Leszczyński, Piechota (POL)
19 July 2019; 18:30	2× (yellow card) 1× (suspension)	Report	1× (yellow card) 3× (suspension)	Complejo Deportivo de As Travesas, Vigo; Attendance: 140; Referees: Leszczyński, Piechota (POL)

19 July 2019; 21:00	Spain	29–26	Serbia	Complejo Deportivo de As Travesas, Vigo; Attendance: 400; Referees: Mitrović, Vešović (MNE)
19 July 2019; 21:00	Valera 8	(13–12)	Milić 5	Complejo Deportivo de As Travesas, Vigo; Attendance: 400; Referees: Mitrović, Vešović (MNE)
19 July 2019; 21:00	4× (yellow card) 3× (suspension)	Report	3× (yellow card) 8× (suspension) 1× (red card)	Complejo Deportivo de As Travesas, Vigo; Attendance: 400; Referees: Mitrović, Vešović (MNE)

21 July 2019; 16:30	United States	23–30	Tunisia	Complejo Deportivo de As Travesas, Vigo; Attendance: 80; Referees: Al-Mawt, Marhoon (BHR)
21 July 2019; 16:30	Bengozi 6	(12–13)	Darmoul 7	Complejo Deportivo de As Travesas, Vigo; Attendance: 80; Referees: Al-Mawt, Marhoon (BHR)
21 July 2019; 16:30	1× (yellow card) 7× (suspension) 1× (red card)	Report	1× (yellow card) 5× (suspension)	Complejo Deportivo de As Travesas, Vigo; Attendance: 80; Referees: Al-Mawt, Marhoon (BHR)

21 July 2019; 18:30	Serbia	28–30	Slovenia	Complejo Deportivo de As Travesas, Vigo; Attendance: 300; Referees: Erdoğan, Özdeniz (TUR)
21 July 2019; 18:30	S. Milić, Vignjević 5	(15–16)	Ocvirk 10	Complejo Deportivo de As Travesas, Vigo; Attendance: 300; Referees: Erdoğan, Özdeniz (TUR)
21 July 2019; 18:30	2× (yellow card) 4× (suspension)	Report	3× (yellow card) 4× (suspension)	Complejo Deportivo de As Travesas, Vigo; Attendance: 300; Referees: Erdoğan, Özdeniz (TUR)

21 July 2019; 21:00	Spain	28–22	Japan	Complejo Deportivo de As Travesas, Vigo; Attendance: 900; Referees: Burgos, Delgado (ARG)
21 July 2019; 21:00	Suárez 7	(13–11)	Tokuda 7	Complejo Deportivo de As Travesas, Vigo; Attendance: 900; Referees: Burgos, Delgado (ARG)
21 July 2019; 21:00	2× (yellow card) 3× (suspension)	Report	1× (yellow card) 2× (suspension)	Complejo Deportivo de As Travesas, Vigo; Attendance: 900; Referees: Burgos, Delgado (ARG)

22 July 2019; 16:30	Japan	21–20	United States	Complejo Deportivo de As Travesas, Vigo; Attendance: 60; Referees: Lončar, Lončar (CRO)
22 July 2019; 16:30	Fujita, Kawasaki 5	(5–11)	Bengozi, Seifert 4	Complejo Deportivo de As Travesas, Vigo; Attendance: 60; Referees: Lončar, Lončar (CRO)
22 July 2019; 16:30	6× (suspension) 1× (red card)	Report	1× (yellow card) 3× (suspension)	Complejo Deportivo de As Travesas, Vigo; Attendance: 60; Referees: Lončar, Lončar (CRO)

22 July 2019; 18:30	Serbia	23–29	Tunisia	Complejo Deportivo de As Travesas, Vigo; Attendance: 250; Referees: Cheng, Zhou (CHN)
22 July 2019; 18:30	Milić 5	(14–17)	Aidi 8	Complejo Deportivo de As Travesas, Vigo; Attendance: 250; Referees: Cheng, Zhou (CHN)
22 July 2019; 18:30	2× (yellow card) 4× (suspension) 1× (red card)	Report	1× (yellow card) 5× (suspension)	Complejo Deportivo de As Travesas, Vigo; Attendance: 250; Referees: Cheng, Zhou (CHN)

22 July 2019; 21:00	Slovenia	22–21	Spain	Complejo Deportivo de As Travesas, Vigo; Attendance: 1,600; Referees: Alpaidze, Berzkina (RUS)
22 July 2019; 21:00	Ocvirk 10	(11–11)	Pérez Arce 8	Complejo Deportivo de As Travesas, Vigo; Attendance: 1,600; Referees: Alpaidze, Berzkina (RUS)
22 July 2019; 21:00	3× (yellow card) 4× (suspension)	Report	2× (yellow card) 4× (suspension)	Complejo Deportivo de As Travesas, Vigo; Attendance: 1,600; Referees: Alpaidze, Berzkina (RUS)

=== Group B ===
Pos	Team	Pld	W	D	L	GF	GA	GD	Pts	Qualification
1	Egypt	5	5	0	0	198	137	+61	10	Round of 16
2	Sweden	5	4	0	1	168	124	+44	8	Round of 16
3	France	5	3	0	2	199	126	+73	6	Round of 16
4	South Korea	5	2	0	3	176	168	+8	4	Round of 16
5	Nigeria	5	1	0	4	139	199	−60	2	
6	Australia	5	0	0	5	85	211	−126	0	

Source: IHF
Rules for classification: 1) points; 2) head-to-head points; 3) head-to-head goal difference; 4) head-to-head number of goals scored; 5) goal difference.

16 July 2019; 10:00	Egypt	44–17	Australia	Complejo Deportivo de As Travesas, Vigo; Attendance: 100; Referees: Năstase, Stancu (ROU)
16 July 2019; 10:00	Khaled, Mamdouh 5	(21–6)	McCourt 6	Complejo Deportivo de As Travesas, Vigo; Attendance: 100; Referees: Năstase, Stancu (ROU)
16 July 2019; 10:00	2× (yellow card) 1× (suspension)	Report	2× (yellow card) 1× (suspension)	Complejo Deportivo de As Travesas, Vigo; Attendance: 100; Referees: Năstase, Stancu (ROU)

16 July 2019; 12:00	France	48–19	Nigeria	Complejo Deportivo de As Travesas, Vigo; Attendance: 100; Referees: Konjičanin, Konjičanin (BIH)
16 July 2019; 12:00	Kempf 9	(26–9)	Hassan 7	Complejo Deportivo de As Travesas, Vigo; Attendance: 100; Referees: Konjičanin, Konjičanin (BIH)
16 July 2019; 12:00	2× (yellow card) 5× (suspension)	Report	6× (suspension)	Complejo Deportivo de As Travesas, Vigo; Attendance: 100; Referees: Konjičanin, Konjičanin (BIH)

16 July 2019; 14:00	Sweden	34–28	South Korea	Complejo Deportivo de As Travesas, Vigo; Attendance: 80; Referees: Mitrović, Vešović (MNE)
16 July 2019; 14:00	Wallinius 6	(16–16)	Shin 11	Complejo Deportivo de As Travesas, Vigo; Attendance: 80; Referees: Mitrović, Vešović (MNE)
16 July 2019; 14:00	2× (yellow card) 6× (suspension)	Report	1× (yellow card) 3× (suspension)	Complejo Deportivo de As Travesas, Vigo; Attendance: 80; Referees: Mitrović, Vešović (MNE)

17 July 2019; 17:00	Nigeria	30–47	Egypt	Complejo Deportivo de As Travesas, Vigo; Attendance: 100; Referees: Erdoğan, Özdeniz (TUR)
17 July 2019; 17:00	Mohammed 6	(13–18)	Khorshid 9	Complejo Deportivo de As Travesas, Vigo; Attendance: 100; Referees: Erdoğan, Özdeniz (TUR)
17 July 2019; 17:00	4× (suspension) 1× (red card)	Report	2× (yellow card) 4× (suspension)	Complejo Deportivo de As Travesas, Vigo; Attendance: 100; Referees: Erdoğan, Özdeniz (TUR)

17 July 2019; 19:00	Australia	16–44	Sweden	Complejo Deportivo de As Travesas, Vigo; Attendance: 200; Referees: Kulik, Nabokau (BLR)
17 July 2019; 19:00	Ljungberg, Prokic 5	(6–20)	Lindberg 7	Complejo Deportivo de As Travesas, Vigo; Attendance: 200; Referees: Kulik, Nabokau (BLR)
17 July 2019; 19:00	1× (yellow card) 1× (suspension)	Report	2× (yellow card) 3× (suspension)	Complejo Deportivo de As Travesas, Vigo; Attendance: 200; Referees: Kulik, Nabokau (BLR)

17 July 2019; 21:00	South Korea	32–46	France	Complejo Deportivo de As Travesas, Vigo; Attendance: 150; Referees: Lončar, Lončar (CRO)
17 July 2019; 21:00	Kim Ji. 10	(15–26)	Kempf 12	Complejo Deportivo de As Travesas, Vigo; Attendance: 150; Referees: Lončar, Lončar (CRO)
17 July 2019; 21:00	1× (yellow card) 4× (suspension)	Report	1× (yellow card) 8× (suspension)	Complejo Deportivo de As Travesas, Vigo; Attendance: 150; Referees: Lončar, Lončar (CRO)

19 July 2019; 10:00	Nigeria	30–42	South Korea	Complejo Deportivo de As Travesas, Vigo; Attendance: 80; Referees: Al-Mawt, Marhoon (BHR)
19 July 2019; 10:00	Anas 8	(19–21)	Kim R. 12	Complejo Deportivo de As Travesas, Vigo; Attendance: 80; Referees: Al-Mawt, Marhoon (BHR)
19 July 2019; 10:00	3× (yellow card) 1× (suspension) 2× (red card)	Report	2× (yellow card) 6× (suspension)	Complejo Deportivo de As Travesas, Vigo; Attendance: 80; Referees: Al-Mawt, Marhoon (BHR)

19 July 2019; 12:00	Egypt	32–22	Sweden	Complejo Deportivo de As Travesas, Vigo; Attendance: 110; Referees: Lončar, Lončar (CRO)
19 July 2019; 12:00	Dahroug 7	(14–11)	Jurmala 6	Complejo Deportivo de As Travesas, Vigo; Attendance: 110; Referees: Lončar, Lončar (CRO)
19 July 2019; 12:00	1× (yellow card) 3× (suspension)	Report	1× (yellow card) 2× (suspension)	Complejo Deportivo de As Travesas, Vigo; Attendance: 110; Referees: Lončar, Lončar (CRO)

19 July 2019; 14:00	France	50–11	Australia	Complejo Deportivo de As Travesas, Vigo; Attendance: 100; Referees: Zhou, Cheng (CHN)
19 July 2019; 14:00	Gaudin 8	(26–7)	Burgonye, McCourt 3	Complejo Deportivo de As Travesas, Vigo; Attendance: 100; Referees: Zhou, Cheng (CHN)
19 July 2019; 14:00	3× (suspension)	Report	1× (yellow card) 2× (suspension)	Complejo Deportivo de As Travesas, Vigo; Attendance: 100; Referees: Zhou, Cheng (CHN)

20 July 2019; 17:00	Australia	21–35	Nigeria	Complejo Deportivo de As Travesas, Vigo; Attendance: 100; Referees: Leszczyński, Piechota (POL)
20 July 2019; 17:00	Ljungberg, McCourt 6	(11–16)	Mohammed 8	Complejo Deportivo de As Travesas, Vigo; Attendance: 100; Referees: Leszczyński, Piechota (POL)
20 July 2019; 17:00	2× (yellow card) 2× (suspension)	Report	4× (suspension)	Complejo Deportivo de As Travesas, Vigo; Attendance: 100; Referees: Leszczyński, Piechota (POL)

20 July 2019; 19:00	Egypt	38–36	South Korea	Complejo Deportivo de As Travesas, Vigo; Attendance: 100; Referees: Alpaidze, Berzkina (RUS)
20 July 2019; 19:00	Kaddah 9	(19–18)	Shin 11	Complejo Deportivo de As Travesas, Vigo; Attendance: 100; Referees: Alpaidze, Berzkina (RUS)
20 July 2019; 19:00	2× (yellow card) 7× (suspension)	Report	1× (yellow card) 6× (suspension)	Complejo Deportivo de As Travesas, Vigo; Attendance: 100; Referees: Alpaidze, Berzkina (RUS)

20 July 2019; 21:00	Sweden	27–23	France	Complejo Deportivo de As Travesas, Vigo; Attendance: 100; Referees: Belkhiri, Hamidi (ALG)
20 July 2019; 21:00	Thurin, Sandberg 4	(15–11)	Gaudin 8	Complejo Deportivo de As Travesas, Vigo; Attendance: 100; Referees: Belkhiri, Hamidi (ALG)
20 July 2019; 21:00	2× (yellow card) 5× (suspension)	Report	2× (yellow card) 2× (suspension)	Complejo Deportivo de As Travesas, Vigo; Attendance: 100; Referees: Belkhiri, Hamidi (ALG)

22 July 2019; 10:00	South Korea	38–20	Australia	Complejo Deportivo de As Travesas, Vigo; Attendance: 75; Referees: Burgos, Delgado (ARG)
22 July 2019; 10:00	Lee Y. 6	(20–15)	Ljungberg 6	Complejo Deportivo de As Travesas, Vigo; Attendance: 75; Referees: Burgos, Delgado (ARG)
22 July 2019; 10:00	2× (yellow card) 3× (suspension)	Report	2× (yellow card) 2× (suspension)	Complejo Deportivo de As Travesas, Vigo; Attendance: 75; Referees: Burgos, Delgado (ARG)

22 July 2019; 12:00	Sweden	41–25	Nigeria	Complejo Deportivo de As Travesas, Vigo; Attendance: 100; Referees: Konjičanin, Konjičanin (BIH)
22 July 2019; 12:00	Wedberg 13	(21–14)	Rotibi 6	Complejo Deportivo de As Travesas, Vigo; Attendance: 100; Referees: Konjičanin, Konjičanin (BIH)
22 July 2019; 12:00	1× (yellow card) 3× (suspension)	Report	3× (suspension) 3× (red card)	Complejo Deportivo de As Travesas, Vigo; Attendance: 100; Referees: Konjičanin, Konjičanin (BIH)

22 July 2019; 14:00	France	32–37	Egypt	Complejo Deportivo de As Travesas, Vigo; Attendance: 60; Referees: Erdoğan, Özdeniz (TUR)
22 July 2019; 14:00	Gaudin 8	(16–20)	Ramadan 8	Complejo Deportivo de As Travesas, Vigo; Attendance: 60; Referees: Erdoğan, Özdeniz (TUR)
22 July 2019; 14:00	5× (suspension) 1× (red card)	Report	2× (yellow card) 3× (suspension)	Complejo Deportivo de As Travesas, Vigo; Attendance: 60; Referees: Erdoğan, Özdeniz (TUR)

=== Group C ===
Pos	Team	Pld	W	D	L	GF	GA	GD	Pts	Qualification
1	Croatia	5	5	0	0	157	131	+26	10	Round of 16
2	Brazil	5	4	0	1	158	137	+21	8	Round of 16
3	Portugal	5	3	0	2	157	143	+14	6	Round of 16
4	Hungary	5	2	0	3	155	155	0	4	Round of 16
5	Bahrain	5	0	1	4	135	151	−16	1 (Note: Bahrain 29–29 Kosovo)	
6	Kosovo	5	0	1	4	111	156	−45	1	

Source: IHF
Rules for classification: 1) points; 2) head-to-head points; 3) head-to-head goal difference; 4) head-to-head number of goals scored; 5) goal difference.
Notes:

16 July 2019; 17:00	Croatia	23–17	Kosovo	Pavillón Municipal dos Deportes de Pontevedra, Pontevedra; Referees: Krichen, Makhlouf (TUN)
16 July 2019; 17:00	Vistorop 7	(14–11)	Muqolli 7	Pavillón Municipal dos Deportes de Pontevedra, Pontevedra; Referees: Krichen, Makhlouf (TUN)
16 July 2019; 17:00	2× (yellow card) 5× (suspension)	Report	3× (suspension)	Pavillón Municipal dos Deportes de Pontevedra, Pontevedra; Referees: Krichen, Makhlouf (TUN)

16 July 2019; 19:00	Portugal	30–35	Brazil	Pavillón Municipal dos Deportes de Pontevedra, Pontevedra; Attendance: 1,500; Referees: Gasmi, Gasmi (FRA)
16 July 2019; 19:00	D. Silva 13	(11–21)	G. Silva 7	Pavillón Municipal dos Deportes de Pontevedra, Pontevedra; Attendance: 1,500; Referees: Gasmi, Gasmi (FRA)
16 July 2019; 19:00	4× (suspension)	Report	8× (suspension)	Pavillón Municipal dos Deportes de Pontevedra, Pontevedra; Attendance: 1,500; Referees: Gasmi, Gasmi (FRA)

16 July 2019; 20:30	Hungary	34–30	Bahrain	Complejo Deportivo de As Travesas, Vigo; Attendance: 90; Referees: Hizaki, Ikebuchi (JPN)
16 July 2019; 20:30	Máthé 9	(17–11)	Fadhul 10	Complejo Deportivo de As Travesas, Vigo; Attendance: 90; Referees: Hizaki, Ikebuchi (JPN)
16 July 2019; 20:30	3× (suspension)	Report	2× (yellow card) 4× (suspension)	Complejo Deportivo de As Travesas, Vigo; Attendance: 90; Referees: Hizaki, Ikebuchi (JPN)

18 July 2019; 16:00	Bahrain	27–29	Portugal	Pavillón Municipal dos Deportes de Pontevedra, Pontevedra; Referees: Belkhiri, Hamidi (ALG)
18 July 2019; 16:00	Mohamed 7	(12–15)	D. Silva 11	Pavillón Municipal dos Deportes de Pontevedra, Pontevedra; Referees: Belkhiri, Hamidi (ALG)
18 July 2019; 16:00	1× (yellow card) 4× (suspension)	Report	2× (yellow card) 7× (suspension) 1× (red card)	Pavillón Municipal dos Deportes de Pontevedra, Pontevedra; Referees: Belkhiri, Hamidi (ALG)

18 July 2019; 18:00	Brazil	29–33	Croatia	Pavillón Municipal dos Deportes de Pontevedra, Pontevedra; Attendance: 450; Referees: Álvarez, Bustamante (ESP)
18 July 2019; 18:00	Santos 8	(17–16)	Vistorop 8	Pavillón Municipal dos Deportes de Pontevedra, Pontevedra; Attendance: 450; Referees: Álvarez, Bustamante (ESP)
18 July 2019; 18:00	1× (yellow card) 4× (suspension)	Report	2× (yellow card) 9× (suspension)	Pavillón Municipal dos Deportes de Pontevedra, Pontevedra; Attendance: 450; Referees: Álvarez, Bustamante (ESP)

18 July 2019; 20:00	Kosovo	21–36	Hungary	Pavillón Municipal dos Deportes de Pontevedra, Pontevedra; Referees: Cheng, Zhou (CHN)
18 July 2019; 20:00	Basholli 5	(9–20)	Schäffer 8	Pavillón Municipal dos Deportes de Pontevedra, Pontevedra; Referees: Cheng, Zhou (CHN)
18 July 2019; 20:00	1× (yellow card) 3× (suspension) 1× (red card)	Report	1× (yellow card)	Pavillón Municipal dos Deportes de Pontevedra, Pontevedra; Referees: Cheng, Zhou (CHN)

19 July 2019; 16:30	Portugal	32–21	Kosovo	Pavillón Municipal dos Deportes de Pontevedra, Pontevedra; Attendance: 100; Referees: Álvarez, Bustamante (ESP)
19 July 2019; 16:30	D. Silva 8	(16–10)	Muqolli 7	Pavillón Municipal dos Deportes de Pontevedra, Pontevedra; Attendance: 100; Referees: Álvarez, Bustamante (ESP)
19 July 2019; 16:30	1× (yellow card) 2× (suspension)	Report	1× (yellow card) 1× (suspension) 1× (red card)	Pavillón Municipal dos Deportes de Pontevedra, Pontevedra; Attendance: 100; Referees: Álvarez, Bustamante (ESP)

19 July 2019; 18:30	Croatia	37–32	Hungary	Pavillón Municipal dos Deportes de Pontevedra, Pontevedra; Attendance: 250; Referees: Burgos, Delgado (ARG)
19 July 2019; 18:30	Martinović 12	(22–15)	Borzas 9	Pavillón Municipal dos Deportes de Pontevedra, Pontevedra; Attendance: 250; Referees: Burgos, Delgado (ARG)
19 July 2019; 18:30	3× (yellow card) 5× (suspension)	Report	2× (yellow card) 4× (suspension)	Pavillón Municipal dos Deportes de Pontevedra, Pontevedra; Attendance: 250; Referees: Burgos, Delgado (ARG)

19 July 2019; 20:30	Brazil	27–26	Bahrain	Pavillón Municipal dos Deportes de Pontevedra, Pontevedra; Attendance: 100; Referees: Alpaidze, Berzkina (RUS)
19 July 2019; 20:30	Pacheco 6	(7–11)	Fadhul 7	Pavillón Municipal dos Deportes de Pontevedra, Pontevedra; Attendance: 100; Referees: Alpaidze, Berzkina (RUS)
19 July 2019; 20:30	3× (yellow card) 3× (suspension)	Report	2× (yellow card) 5× (suspension)	Pavillón Municipal dos Deportes de Pontevedra, Pontevedra; Attendance: 100; Referees: Alpaidze, Berzkina (RUS)

21 July 2019; 16:00	Croatia	32–23	Bahrain	Pavillón Municipal dos Deportes de Pontevedra, Pontevedra; Attendance: 100; Referees: Cheng, Zhou (CHN)
21 July 2019; 16:00	Jaganjac 8	(13–12)	Mohamed 4	Pavillón Municipal dos Deportes de Pontevedra, Pontevedra; Attendance: 100; Referees: Cheng, Zhou (CHN)
21 July 2019; 16:00	2× (yellow card) 8× (suspension)	Report	3× (yellow card) 4× (suspension)	Pavillón Municipal dos Deportes de Pontevedra, Pontevedra; Attendance: 100; Referees: Cheng, Zhou (CHN)

21 July 2019; 18:00	Kosovo	22–36	Brazil	Pavillón Municipal dos Deportes de Pontevedra, Pontevedra; Attendance: 150; Referees: Hizaki, Ikebuchi (JPN)
21 July 2019; 18:00	Tahirukaj 8	(10–18)	Torriani 8	Pavillón Municipal dos Deportes de Pontevedra, Pontevedra; Attendance: 150; Referees: Hizaki, Ikebuchi (JPN)
21 July 2019; 18:00	4× (suspension) 1× (red card)	Report	4× (suspension)	Pavillón Municipal dos Deportes de Pontevedra, Pontevedra; Attendance: 150; Referees: Hizaki, Ikebuchi (JPN)

21 July 2019; 20:00	Hungary	28–36	Portugal	Pavillón Municipal dos Deportes de Pontevedra, Pontevedra; Attendance: 100; Referees: Krichen, Makhlouf (TUN)
21 July 2019; 20:00	Schäffer 5	(13–18)	D. Silva 8	Pavillón Municipal dos Deportes de Pontevedra, Pontevedra; Attendance: 100; Referees: Krichen, Makhlouf (TUN)
21 July 2019; 20:00	1× (yellow card) 4× (suspension) 1× (red card)	Report	1× (yellow card) 3× (suspension)	Pavillón Municipal dos Deportes de Pontevedra, Pontevedra; Attendance: 100; Referees: Krichen, Makhlouf (TUN)

22 July 2019; 16:30	Bahrain	29–29	Kosovo	Pavillón Municipal dos Deportes de Pontevedra, Pontevedra; Referees: Kulik, Nabokau (BLR)
22 July 2019; 16:30	Ali, Fadhul 7	(15–14)	Tahirukaj 6	Pavillón Municipal dos Deportes de Pontevedra, Pontevedra; Referees: Kulik, Nabokau (BLR)
22 July 2019; 16:30	2× (yellow card) 6× (suspension) 1× (red card)	Report	1× (yellow card) 3× (suspension) 1× (red card)	Pavillón Municipal dos Deportes de Pontevedra, Pontevedra; Referees: Kulik, Nabokau (BLR)

22 July 2019; 18:30	Portugal	30–32	Croatia	Pavillón Municipal dos Deportes de Pontevedra, Pontevedra; Attendance: 285; Referees: Krichen, Makhlouf (TUN)
22 July 2019; 18:30	D. Silva 8	(14–16)	Šarac 9	Pavillón Municipal dos Deportes de Pontevedra, Pontevedra; Attendance: 285; Referees: Krichen, Makhlouf (TUN)
22 July 2019; 18:30	3× (suspension)	Report	5× (suspension)	Pavillón Municipal dos Deportes de Pontevedra, Pontevedra; Attendance: 285; Referees: Krichen, Makhlouf (TUN)

22 July 2019; 20:30	Hungary	25–31	Brazil	Pavillón Municipal dos Deportes de Pontevedra, Pontevedra; Attendance: 85; Referees: Năstase, Stancu (ROU)
22 July 2019; 20:30	Máthé 7	(9–14)	Pacheco, G. Silva 6	Pavillón Municipal dos Deportes de Pontevedra, Pontevedra; Attendance: 85; Referees: Năstase, Stancu (ROU)
22 July 2019; 20:30	3× (yellow card) 2× (suspension) 1× (red card)	Report	1× (yellow card) 4× (suspension)	Pavillón Municipal dos Deportes de Pontevedra, Pontevedra; Attendance: 85; Referees: Năstase, Stancu (ROU)

=== Group D ===
Pos	Team	Pld	W	D	L	GF	GA	GD	Pts	Qualification
1	Denmark	5	4	0	1	163	128	+35	8 (Note: Denmark 30–25 Germany)	Round of 16
2	Germany	5	4	0	1	162	114	+48	8	Round of 16
3	Norway	5	3	0	2	147	126	+21	6 (Note: Iceland 19–29 Norway)	Round of 16
4	Iceland	5	3	0	2	113	118	−5	6	Round of 16
5	Chile	5	1	0	4	115	171	−56	2	
6	Argentina	5	0	0	5	113	156	−43	0	

Source: IHF
Rules for classification: 1) points; 2) head-to-head points; 3) head-to-head goal difference; 4) head-to-head number of goals scored; 5) goal difference.
Notes:

16 July 2019; 10:00	Iceland	26–19	Chile	Pavillón Municipal dos Deportes de Pontevedra, Pontevedra; Referees: Cheng, Zhou (CHN)
16 July 2019; 10:00	Ásgeirsson 5	(10–10)	Baumann 4	Pavillón Municipal dos Deportes de Pontevedra, Pontevedra; Referees: Cheng, Zhou (CHN)
16 July 2019; 10:00	1× (yellow card) 4× (suspension)	Report	1× (yellow card) 2× (suspension)	Pavillón Municipal dos Deportes de Pontevedra, Pontevedra; Referees: Cheng, Zhou (CHN)

16 July 2019; 12:00	Norway	31–32	Denmark	Pavillón Municipal dos Deportes de Pontevedra, Pontevedra; Attendance: 300; Referees: Álvarez, Bustamante (ESP)
16 July 2019; 12:00	Lode 6	(14–20)	Vinther 11	Pavillón Municipal dos Deportes de Pontevedra, Pontevedra; Attendance: 300; Referees: Álvarez, Bustamante (ESP)
16 July 2019; 12:00	2× (yellow card) 7× (suspension)	Report	2× (yellow card) 5× (suspension) 1× (red card)	Pavillón Municipal dos Deportes de Pontevedra, Pontevedra; Attendance: 300; Referees: Álvarez, Bustamante (ESP)

16 July 2019; 14:00	Germany	43–25	Argentina	Pavillón Municipal dos Deportes de Pontevedra, Pontevedra; Attendance: 120; Referees: Berezkina, Alpaidze (RUS)
16 July 2019; 14:00	Morante 9	(17–16)	López 10	Pavillón Municipal dos Deportes de Pontevedra, Pontevedra; Attendance: 120; Referees: Berezkina, Alpaidze (RUS)
16 July 2019; 14:00	1× (yellow card) 4× (suspension)	Report	2× (yellow card) 5× (suspension)	Pavillón Municipal dos Deportes de Pontevedra, Pontevedra; Attendance: 120; Referees: Berezkina, Alpaidze (RUS)

17 July 2019; 16:00	Argentina	22–26	Iceland	Pavillón Municipal dos Deportes de Pontevedra, Pontevedra; Attendance: 200; Referees: Leszczyński, Piechota (POL)
17 July 2019; 16:00	Martínez, Saud Sulak 4	(10–14)	Valdimarsson 8	Pavillón Municipal dos Deportes de Pontevedra, Pontevedra; Attendance: 200; Referees: Leszczyński, Piechota (POL)
17 July 2019; 16:00	2× (yellow card) 2× (suspension)	Report	3× (yellow card) 6× (suspension)	Pavillón Municipal dos Deportes de Pontevedra, Pontevedra; Attendance: 200; Referees: Leszczyński, Piechota (POL)

17 July 2019; 18:00	Denmark	30–25	Germany	Pavillón Municipal dos Deportes de Pontevedra, Pontevedra; Referees: Hamidi, Belkhiri (ALG)
17 July 2019; 18:00	Lærke 11	(15–15)	Heymann 8	Pavillón Municipal dos Deportes de Pontevedra, Pontevedra; Referees: Hamidi, Belkhiri (ALG)
17 July 2019; 18:00	5× (yellow card) 4× (suspension) 1× (red card)	Report	2× (yellow card) 5× (suspension)	Pavillón Municipal dos Deportes de Pontevedra, Pontevedra; Referees: Hamidi, Belkhiri (ALG)

17 July 2019; 20:00	Chile	25–36	Norway	Pavillón Municipal dos Deportes de Pontevedra, Pontevedra; Attendance: 300; Referees: Mitrović, Vešović (MNE)
17 July 2019; 20:00	López 4	(14–19)	three players 6	Pavillón Municipal dos Deportes de Pontevedra, Pontevedra; Attendance: 300; Referees: Mitrović, Vešović (MNE)
17 July 2019; 20:00	3× (yellow card) 4× (suspension)	Report	3× (yellow card) 3× (suspension)	Pavillón Municipal dos Deportes de Pontevedra, Pontevedra; Attendance: 300; Referees: Mitrović, Vešović (MNE)

19 July 2019; 10:00	Iceland	19–29	Norway	Pavillón Municipal dos Deportes de Pontevedra, Pontevedra; Attendance: 300; Referees: Erdoğan, Özdeniz (TUR)
19 July 2019; 10:00	Þorkelsson 4	(11–17)	Nærland 6	Pavillón Municipal dos Deportes de Pontevedra, Pontevedra; Attendance: 300; Referees: Erdoğan, Özdeniz (TUR)
19 July 2019; 10:00	2× (yellow card) 3× (suspension)	Report	3× (yellow card) 5× (suspension)	Pavillón Municipal dos Deportes de Pontevedra, Pontevedra; Attendance: 300; Referees: Erdoğan, Özdeniz (TUR)

19 July 2019; 12:00	Argentina	23–31	Denmark	Pavillón Municipal dos Deportes de Pontevedra, Pontevedra; Attendance: 300; Referees: Krichen, Makhlouf (TUN)
19 July 2019; 12:00	López 6	(11–13)	Lærke 6	Pavillón Municipal dos Deportes de Pontevedra, Pontevedra; Attendance: 300; Referees: Krichen, Makhlouf (TUN)
19 July 2019; 12:00	2× (yellow card) 2× (suspension)	Report	2× (yellow card) 3× (suspension)	Pavillón Municipal dos Deportes de Pontevedra, Pontevedra; Attendance: 300; Referees: Krichen, Makhlouf (TUN)

19 July 2019; 14:00	Germany	39–22	Chile	Pavillón Municipal dos Deportes de Pontevedra, Pontevedra; Attendance: 100; Referees: Hizaki, Ikebuchi (JPN)
19 July 2019; 14:00	Heymann 6	(19–12)	Gutiérrez 4	Pavillón Municipal dos Deportes de Pontevedra, Pontevedra; Attendance: 100; Referees: Hizaki, Ikebuchi (JPN)
19 July 2019; 14:00	1× (yellow card) 3× (suspension)	Report	3× (suspension)	Pavillón Municipal dos Deportes de Pontevedra, Pontevedra; Attendance: 100; Referees: Hizaki, Ikebuchi (JPN)

20 July 2019; 16:00	Chile	25–22	Argentina	Pavillón Municipal dos Deportes de Pontevedra, Pontevedra; Attendance: 90; Referees: Năstase, Stancu (ROU)
20 July 2019; 16:00	Baumann 9	(14–10)	Flores, Martínez 4	Pavillón Municipal dos Deportes de Pontevedra, Pontevedra; Attendance: 90; Referees: Năstase, Stancu (ROU)
20 July 2019; 16:00	2× (yellow card) 6× (suspension)	Report	2× (yellow card) 3× (suspension)	Pavillón Municipal dos Deportes de Pontevedra, Pontevedra; Attendance: 90; Referees: Năstase, Stancu (ROU)

20 July 2019; 18:00	Iceland	25–22	Denmark	Pavillón Municipal dos Deportes de Pontevedra, Pontevedra; Attendance: 350; Referees: Kulik, Nabokau (BLR)
20 July 2019; 18:00	Valdimarsson 9	(13–9)	Vinther 6	Pavillón Municipal dos Deportes de Pontevedra, Pontevedra; Attendance: 350; Referees: Kulik, Nabokau (BLR)
20 July 2019; 18:00	1× (yellow card) 8× (suspension) 1× (red card)	Report	2× (yellow card) 2× (suspension)	Pavillón Municipal dos Deportes de Pontevedra, Pontevedra; Attendance: 350; Referees: Kulik, Nabokau (BLR)

20 July 2019; 20:00	Norway	20–29	Germany	Pavillón Municipal dos Deportes de Pontevedra, Pontevedra; Attendance: 500; Referees: Konjičanin, Konjičanin (BIH)
20 July 2019; 20:00	Boilesen 4	(12–16)	Ignatov 10	Pavillón Municipal dos Deportes de Pontevedra, Pontevedra; Attendance: 500; Referees: Konjičanin, Konjičanin (BIH)
20 July 2019; 20:00	2× (yellow card) 2× (suspension)	Report	1× (yellow card) 3× (suspension)	Pavillón Municipal dos Deportes de Pontevedra, Pontevedra; Attendance: 500; Referees: Konjičanin, Konjičanin (BIH)

22 July 2019; 10:00	Norway	31–21	Argentina	Pavillón Municipal dos Deportes de Pontevedra, Pontevedra; Attendance: 300; Referees: Mitrović, Vešović (MNE)
22 July 2019; 10:00	three players 4	(15–11)	Martínez 4	Pavillón Municipal dos Deportes de Pontevedra, Pontevedra; Attendance: 300; Referees: Mitrović, Vešović (MNE)
22 July 2019; 10:00	2× (yellow card) 7× (suspension)	Report	3× (yellow card) 3× (suspension)	Pavillón Municipal dos Deportes de Pontevedra, Pontevedra; Attendance: 300; Referees: Mitrović, Vešović (MNE)

22 July 2019; 12:00	Denmark	48–24	Chile	Pavillón Municipal dos Deportes de Pontevedra, Pontevedra; Referees: Hamidi, Belkhiri (ALG)
22 July 2019; 12:00	Jørgensen 8	(23–9)	Codina 5	Pavillón Municipal dos Deportes de Pontevedra, Pontevedra; Referees: Hamidi, Belkhiri (ALG)
22 July 2019; 12:00	2× (yellow card) 3× (suspension)	Report	1× (yellow card)	Pavillón Municipal dos Deportes de Pontevedra, Pontevedra; Referees: Hamidi, Belkhiri (ALG)

22 July 2019; 14:00	Germany	26–17	Iceland	Pavillón Municipal dos Deportes de Pontevedra, Pontevedra; Attendance: 150; Referees: Álvarez, Bustamante (ESP)
22 July 2019; 14:00	Neuhaus 8	(14–8)	Aronsson 4	Pavillón Municipal dos Deportes de Pontevedra, Pontevedra; Attendance: 150; Referees: Álvarez, Bustamante (ESP)
22 July 2019; 14:00	1× (yellow card) 3× (suspension)	Report	4× (yellow card) 5× (suspension)	Pavillón Municipal dos Deportes de Pontevedra, Pontevedra; Attendance: 150; Referees: Álvarez, Bustamante (ESP)

== President's Cup ==
17th place bracket

17th–20th place semifinals
24 July
Japan	26
Nigeria	16
24 July
Bahrain	30
Chile	29

17th place
25 July
Japan	22
Bahrain	23
19th place
25 July
Nigeria	34
Chile	26

21st place bracket

21st–24th place semifinals
24 July
United States	31
Australia	18
24 July
Kosovo	29
Argentina	36

21st place
25 July
United States	20
Argentina	23
23rd place
25 July
Australia	20
Kosovo	38

=== 21st–24th place semifinals ===
24 July 2019; 09:45	United States	31–18	Australia	Complejo Deportivo de As Travesas, Vigo; Attendance: 200; Referees: Hizaki, Ikebuchi (JPN)
24 July 2019; 09:45	Skorupa 7	(15–10)	McCourt 6	Complejo Deportivo de As Travesas, Vigo; Attendance: 200; Referees: Hizaki, Ikebuchi (JPN)
24 July 2019; 09:45	1× (yellow card) 5× (suspension)	Report	3× (yellow card) 3× (suspension)	Complejo Deportivo de As Travesas, Vigo; Attendance: 200; Referees: Hizaki, Ikebuchi (JPN)

24 July 2019; 09:45	Kosovo	29–36	Argentina	Pavillón Municipal dos Deportes de Pontevedra, Pontevedra; Attendance: 70; Referees: Marhoon, Al-Mawt (BHR)
24 July 2019; 09:45	Tahirukaj 7	(13–18)	López 9	Pavillón Municipal dos Deportes de Pontevedra, Pontevedra; Attendance: 70; Referees: Marhoon, Al-Mawt (BHR)
24 July 2019; 09:45	1× (yellow card) 2× (suspension)	Report	2× (yellow card) 1× (suspension)	Pavillón Municipal dos Deportes de Pontevedra, Pontevedra; Attendance: 70; Referees: Marhoon, Al-Mawt (BHR)

=== 17th–20th place semifinals ===
24 July 2019; 12:00	Japan	26–16	Nigeria	Complejo Deportivo de As Travesas, Vigo; Attendance: 100; Referees: Năstase, Stancu (ROU)
24 July 2019; 12:00	Hattori, Sakurai 5	(14–6)	Anas 5	Complejo Deportivo de As Travesas, Vigo; Attendance: 100; Referees: Năstase, Stancu (ROU)
24 July 2019; 12:00	1× (yellow card) 3× (suspension)	Report	1× (yellow card) 4× (suspension)	Complejo Deportivo de As Travesas, Vigo; Attendance: 100; Referees: Năstase, Stancu (ROU)

24 July 2019; 12:00	Bahrain	30–29	Chile	Pavillón Municipal dos Deportes de Pontevedra, Pontevedra; Attendance: 65; Referees: Cheng, Zhou (CHN)
24 July 2019; 12:00	Fadhul, Mohamed 5	(14–13)	Codina 11	Pavillón Municipal dos Deportes de Pontevedra, Pontevedra; Attendance: 65; Referees: Cheng, Zhou (CHN)
24 July 2019; 12:00	3× (yellow card) 5× (suspension)	Report	3× (yellow card) 4× (suspension)	Pavillón Municipal dos Deportes de Pontevedra, Pontevedra; Attendance: 65; Referees: Cheng, Zhou (CHN)

=== 23rd place game ===
25 July 2019; 09:45	Australia	20–38	Kosovo	Pavillón Municipal dos Deportes de Pontevedra, Pontevedra; Attendance: 50; Referees: Cheng, Zhou (CHN)
25 July 2019; 09:45	Prokić 4	(9–21)	Xhafolli 8	Pavillón Municipal dos Deportes de Pontevedra, Pontevedra; Attendance: 50; Referees: Cheng, Zhou (CHN)
25 July 2019; 09:45	1× (yellow card) 1× (suspension)	Report	1× (suspension)	Pavillón Municipal dos Deportes de Pontevedra, Pontevedra; Attendance: 50; Referees: Cheng, Zhou (CHN)

=== 21st place game ===
25 July 2019; 09:45	United States	20–23	Argentina	Complejo Deportivo de As Travesas, Vigo; Attendance: 80; Referees: Năstase, Stancu (ROU)
25 July 2019; 09:45	Seifert 9	(8–11)	López 4	Complejo Deportivo de As Travesas, Vigo; Attendance: 80; Referees: Năstase, Stancu (ROU)
25 July 2019; 09:45	7× (suspension) 1× (red card)	Report	1× (yellow card) 5× (suspension)	Complejo Deportivo de As Travesas, Vigo; Attendance: 80; Referees: Năstase, Stancu (ROU)

=== 19th place game ===
25 July 2019; 12:00	Nigeria	34–26	Chile	Pavillón Municipal dos Deportes de Pontevedra, Pontevedra; Attendance: 85; Referees: Al-Mawt, Marhoon (BHR)
25 July 2019; 12:00	Owolabi 8	(14–10)	Salgado 8	Pavillón Municipal dos Deportes de Pontevedra, Pontevedra; Attendance: 85; Referees: Al-Mawt, Marhoon (BHR)
25 July 2019; 12:00	1× (yellow card) 6× (suspension) 1× (red card)	Report	2× (yellow card) 2× (suspension)	Pavillón Municipal dos Deportes de Pontevedra, Pontevedra; Attendance: 85; Referees: Al-Mawt, Marhoon (BHR)

=== 17th place game ===
25 July 2019; 12:00	Japan	22–23	Bahrain	Complejo Deportivo de As Travesas, Vigo; Attendance: 85; Referees: Lončar, Lončar (CRO)
25 July 2019; 12:00	Hattori, Sueoka 6	(12–12)	Fadhul 8	Complejo Deportivo de As Travesas, Vigo; Attendance: 85; Referees: Lončar, Lončar (CRO)
25 July 2019; 12:00	1× (yellow card) 3× (suspension)	Report	3× (yellow card) 1× (suspension)	Complejo Deportivo de As Travesas, Vigo; Attendance: 85; Referees: Lončar, Lončar (CRO)

== 9–16th placement games ==
The eight losers of the round of 16 are seeded according to their results in the preliminary round against teams ranked 1–4 and play an elimination game to determine their final position.

=== Standings ===
Pos	Team	Pld	W	D	L	GF	GA	GD	Pts
1	Germany	3	2	0	1	80	67	+13	4
2	Spain	3	2	0	1	76	68	+8	4
3	Brazil	3	2	0	1	95	88	+7	4
4	Sweden	3	2	0	1	83	83	0	4
5	Iceland	3	1	0	2	61	77	−16	2
6	Serbia	3	0	0	3	77	88	−11	0
7	Hungary	3	0	0	3	85	104	−19	0
8	South Korea	3	0	0	3	96	118	−22	0

Rules for classification: 1) points; 2) goal difference; 3) number of goals scored.

=== 15th place game ===
25 July 2019; 14:15	Hungary	40–36	South Korea	Complejo Deportivo de As Travesas, Vigo; Attendance: 80; Referees: Mitrović, Vešović (MNE)
25 July 2019; 14:15	Rosta 9	(21–19)	Kim B. 9	Complejo Deportivo de As Travesas, Vigo; Attendance: 80; Referees: Mitrović, Vešović (MNE)
25 July 2019; 14:15	2× (yellow card) 3× (suspension) 1× (red card)	Report	1× (suspension)	Complejo Deportivo de As Travesas, Vigo; Attendance: 80; Referees: Mitrović, Vešović (MNE)

=== 13th place game ===
25 July 2019; 16:30	Iceland	22–24	Serbia	Complejo Deportivo de As Travesas, Vigo; Attendance: 65; Referees: Kulik, Nabokau (BLR)
25 July 2019; 16:30	Valdimarsson 6	(9–16)	Radivojević 6	Complejo Deportivo de As Travesas, Vigo; Attendance: 65; Referees: Kulik, Nabokau (BLR)
25 July 2019; 16:30	3× (yellow card)	Report	2× (yellow card) 1× (red card)	Complejo Deportivo de As Travesas, Vigo; Attendance: 65; Referees: Kulik, Nabokau (BLR)

=== Eleventh place game ===
25 July 2019; 14:15	Brazil	30–36	Sweden	Pavillón Municipal dos Deportes de Pontevedra, Pontevedra; Attendance: 125; Referees: Alpaidze, Berzkina (RUS)
25 July 2019; 14:15	Catarino, Torriani 6	(18–20)	Astrom 7	Pavillón Municipal dos Deportes de Pontevedra, Pontevedra; Attendance: 125; Referees: Alpaidze, Berzkina (RUS)
25 July 2019; 14:15	1× (yellow card) 2× (suspension)	Report	2× (yellow card) 5× (suspension) 1× (red card)	Pavillón Municipal dos Deportes de Pontevedra, Pontevedra; Attendance: 125; Referees: Alpaidze, Berzkina (RUS)

=== Ninth place game ===
25 July 2019
16:30
Germany
29–28
Spain
Pavillón Municipal dos Deportes de Pontevedra, Pontevedra
Attendance: 750
Referees: Krichen, Makhlouf (TUN)
Timm 5
(13–15)
Suárez 10
1× (yellow card) 3× (suspension)
Report
3× (suspension) 1× (red card)

FT: 23–23 Pen: 6–5

== Bracket ==
Championship bracket

Round of 16
24 July
Egypt	30
Serbia	29
24 July
Norway	29
Brazil	28
24 July
France	24
Spain	23
24 July
Denmark	30
Hungary	29
24 July
Slovenia	32
South Korea	28
24 July
Portugal (ET)	37
Germany	36
24 July
Tunisia	29
Sweden	26
24 July
Croatia	29
Iceland	16

Quarterfinals
25 July
Egypt	29
Norway	27
25 July
France	35
Denmark	32
25 July
Slovenia	25
Portugal	26
25 July
Tunisia	24
Croatia	27

Semifinals
27 July
Egypt	33
France	35
27 July
Portugal	28
Croatia	31

Final
28 July
France	28
Croatia	23
Third place
28 July
Egypt	37
Portugal	27

5–8th place bracket

5th–8th place semifinals
27 July
Norway	34
Denmark	40
27 July
Slovenia	31
Tunisia	27

Fifth place
28 July
Denmark	34
Slovenia	26
Seventh place
28 July
Norway	36
Tunisia	37

=== Round of 16 ===
24 July 2019; 14:15	Egypt	30–29	Serbia	Complejo Deportivo de As Travesas, Vigo; Attendance: 80; Referees: Gasmi, Gasmi (FRA)
24 July 2019; 14:15	Ramadan 7	(15–14)	Milosavljević 6	Complejo Deportivo de As Travesas, Vigo; Attendance: 80; Referees: Gasmi, Gasmi (FRA)
24 July 2019; 14:15	2× (yellow card) 3× (suspension)	Report	2× (yellow card) 7× (suspension) 1× (red card)	Complejo Deportivo de As Travesas, Vigo; Attendance: 80; Referees: Gasmi, Gasmi (FRA)

24 July 2019; 14:15	Denmark	30–29	Hungary	Pavillón Municipal dos Deportes de Pontevedra, Pontevedra; Attendance: 145; Referees: Erdoğan, Özdeniz (TUR)
24 July 2019; 14:15	Lærke 11	(16–14)	Máthé 10	Pavillón Municipal dos Deportes de Pontevedra, Pontevedra; Attendance: 145; Referees: Erdoğan, Özdeniz (TUR)
24 July 2019; 14:15	2× (yellow card) 3× (suspension)	Report	1× (yellow card) 4× (suspension) 2× (red card)	Pavillón Municipal dos Deportes de Pontevedra, Pontevedra; Attendance: 145; Referees: Erdoğan, Özdeniz (TUR)

24 July 2019; 16:30	Slovenia	32–28	South Korea	Complejo Deportivo de As Travesas, Vigo; Attendance: 75; Referees: Lončar, Lončar (CRO)
24 July 2019; 16:30	Ocvirk 11	(17–17)	Kim R. 8	Complejo Deportivo de As Travesas, Vigo; Attendance: 75; Referees: Lončar, Lončar (CRO)
24 July 2019; 16:30	1× (yellow card) 5× (suspension)	Report	2× (yellow card) 3× (suspension)	Complejo Deportivo de As Travesas, Vigo; Attendance: 75; Referees: Lončar, Lončar (CRO)

24 July 2019; 16:30	Norway	29–28	Brazil	Pavillón Municipal dos Deportes de Pontevedra, Pontevedra; Attendance: 310; Referees: Krichen, Makhlouf (TUN)
24 July 2019; 16:30	Lode 7	(12–13)	Torriani 7	Pavillón Municipal dos Deportes de Pontevedra, Pontevedra; Attendance: 310; Referees: Krichen, Makhlouf (TUN)
24 July 2019; 16:30	1× (yellow card) 7× (suspension) 1× (red card)	Report	1× (yellow card) 2× (suspension)	Pavillón Municipal dos Deportes de Pontevedra, Pontevedra; Attendance: 310; Referees: Krichen, Makhlouf (TUN)

24 July 2019; 18:45	Croatia	29–16	Iceland	Complejo Deportivo de As Travesas, Vigo; Attendance: 75; Referees: Konjičanin, Konjičanin (BIH)
24 July 2019; 18:45	Vistorop 6	(13–7)	Þorkelsson 5	Complejo Deportivo de As Travesas, Vigo; Attendance: 75; Referees: Konjičanin, Konjičanin (BIH)
24 July 2019; 18:45	1× (yellow card) 5× (suspension)	Report	5× (suspension)	Complejo Deportivo de As Travesas, Vigo; Attendance: 75; Referees: Konjičanin, Konjičanin (BIH)

24 July 2019
18:45
Portugal
37–36 (ET)
Germany
Pavillón Municipal dos Deportes de Pontevedra, Pontevedra
Attendance: 1,500
Referees: Álvarez, Bustamante (ESP)
Gomes, D. Silva 8
(14–14)
Ignatov 10
1× (yellow card) 4× (suspension) 1× (red card)
Report
2× (yellow card) 3× (suspension)

FT: 30–30 ET: 7–6

24 July 2019; 21:00	Tunisia	29–26	Sweden	Complejo Deportivo de As Travesas, Vigo; Attendance: 152; Referees: Burgos, Delgado (ARG)
24 July 2019; 21:00	Darmoul 12	(14–13)	Salihi 7	Complejo Deportivo de As Travesas, Vigo; Attendance: 152; Referees: Burgos, Delgado (ARG)
24 July 2019; 21:00	2× (suspension)	Report	3× (yellow card) 1× (suspension)	Complejo Deportivo de As Travesas, Vigo; Attendance: 152; Referees: Burgos, Delgado (ARG)

24 July 2019; 21:00	France	24–23	Spain	Pavillón Municipal dos Deportes de Pontevedra, Pontevedra; Attendance: 2,100; Referees: Belkhiri, Hamidi (ALG)
24 July 2019; 21:00	Gaudin 9	(13–10)	Pérez, Tarrafeta 7	Pavillón Municipal dos Deportes de Pontevedra, Pontevedra; Attendance: 2,100; Referees: Belkhiri, Hamidi (ALG)
24 July 2019; 21:00	2× (yellow card) 5× (suspension)	Report	2× (yellow card) 1× (suspension)	Pavillón Municipal dos Deportes de Pontevedra, Pontevedra; Attendance: 2,100; Referees: Belkhiri, Hamidi (ALG)

=== Quarterfinals ===
25 July 2019; 18:45	Egypt	29–27	Norway	Complejo Deportivo de As Travesas, Vigo; Attendance: 105; Referees: Álvarez, Bustamante (ESP)
25 July 2019; 18:45	three players 5	(12–14)	Boilesen 6	Complejo Deportivo de As Travesas, Vigo; Attendance: 105; Referees: Álvarez, Bustamante (ESP)
25 July 2019; 18:45	1× (yellow card) 3× (suspension)	Report	1× (yellow card) 4× (suspension)	Complejo Deportivo de As Travesas, Vigo; Attendance: 105; Referees: Álvarez, Bustamante (ESP)

25 July 2019; 18:45	France	35–32	Denmark	Pavillón Municipal dos Deportes de Pontevedra, Pontevedra; Attendance: 600; Referees: Konjičanin, Konjičanin (BIH)
25 July 2019; 18:45	Prandi 7	(14–16)	Lærke 7	Pavillón Municipal dos Deportes de Pontevedra, Pontevedra; Attendance: 600; Referees: Konjičanin, Konjičanin (BIH)
25 July 2019; 18:45	1× (yellow card) 2× (suspension) 1× (red card)	Report	1× (yellow card) 2× (suspension)	Pavillón Municipal dos Deportes de Pontevedra, Pontevedra; Attendance: 600; Referees: Konjičanin, Konjičanin (BIH)

25 July 2019; 21:00	Portugal	26–25	Slovenia	Complejo Deportivo de As Travesas, Vigo; Attendance: 205; Referees: Erdoğan, Özdeniz (TUR)
25 July 2019; 21:00	Vieira 7	(13–14)	Ocvirk 13	Complejo Deportivo de As Travesas, Vigo; Attendance: 205; Referees: Erdoğan, Özdeniz (TUR)
25 July 2019; 21:00	2× (yellow card) 4× (suspension) 1× (red card)	Report	2× (yellow card) 6× (suspension)	Complejo Deportivo de As Travesas, Vigo; Attendance: 205; Referees: Erdoğan, Özdeniz (TUR)

25 July 2019; 21:00	Tunisia	24–27	Croatia	Pavillón Municipal dos Deportes de Pontevedra, Pontevedra; Attendance: 200; Referees: Gasmi, Gasmi (FRA)
25 July 2019; 21:00	Bannour 7	(9–13)	Martinović 9	Pavillón Municipal dos Deportes de Pontevedra, Pontevedra; Attendance: 200; Referees: Gasmi, Gasmi (FRA)
25 July 2019; 21:00	1× (yellow card) 2× (suspension)	Report	2× (yellow card) 4× (suspension)	Pavillón Municipal dos Deportes de Pontevedra, Pontevedra; Attendance: 200; Referees: Gasmi, Gasmi (FRA)

=== 5th–8th place semifinals ===
27 July 2019; 13:00	Norway	34–40	Denmark	Pavillón Municipal dos Deportes de Pontevedra, Pontevedra; Attendance: 200; Referees: Gasmi, Gasmi (FRA)
27 July 2019; 13:00	Boilesen 8	(22–18)	Gidsel 9	Pavillón Municipal dos Deportes de Pontevedra, Pontevedra; Attendance: 200; Referees: Gasmi, Gasmi (FRA)
27 July 2019; 13:00	2× (yellow card) 2× (suspension)	Report	1× (yellow card) 4× (suspension) 1× (red card)	Pavillón Municipal dos Deportes de Pontevedra, Pontevedra; Attendance: 200; Referees: Gasmi, Gasmi (FRA)

27 July 2019; 15:30	Slovenia	31–27	Tunisia	Pavillón Municipal dos Deportes de Pontevedra, Pontevedra; Attendance: 305; Referees: Mitrović, Vešović (MNE)
27 July 2019; 15:30	Ocvirk 11	(17–13)	Aidi 8	Pavillón Municipal dos Deportes de Pontevedra, Pontevedra; Attendance: 305; Referees: Mitrović, Vešović (MNE)
27 July 2019; 15:30	4× (yellow card) 5× (suspension)	Report	2× (yellow card) 4× (suspension)	Pavillón Municipal dos Deportes de Pontevedra, Pontevedra; Attendance: 305; Referees: Mitrović, Vešović (MNE)

=== Semifinals ===
27 July 2019; 18:00	Egypt	33–35	France	Pavillón Municipal dos Deportes de Pontevedra, Pontevedra; Attendance: 1,200; Referees: Konjičanin, Konjičanin (BIH)
27 July 2019; 18:00	three players 5	(16–19)	Gaudin 7	Pavillón Municipal dos Deportes de Pontevedra, Pontevedra; Attendance: 1,200; Referees: Konjičanin, Konjičanin (BIH)
27 July 2019; 18:00	2× (suspension)	Report	3× (yellow card) 4× (suspension)	Pavillón Municipal dos Deportes de Pontevedra, Pontevedra; Attendance: 1,200; Referees: Konjičanin, Konjičanin (BIH)

27 July 2019; 20:30	Portugal	28–31	Croatia	Pavillón Municipal dos Deportes de Pontevedra, Pontevedra; Attendance: 1,200; Referees: Belkhiri, Hamidi (ALG)
27 July 2019; 20:30	D. Silva 9	(9–12)	Martinović 8	Pavillón Municipal dos Deportes de Pontevedra, Pontevedra; Attendance: 1,200; Referees: Belkhiri, Hamidi (ALG)
27 July 2019; 20:30	1× (yellow card) 4× (suspension)	Report	2× (yellow card) 4× (suspension) 1× (red card)	Pavillón Municipal dos Deportes de Pontevedra, Pontevedra; Attendance: 1,200; Referees: Belkhiri, Hamidi (ALG)

=== Seventh place game ===
28 July 2019; 09:00	Norway	36–37	Tunisia	Complejo Deportivo de As Travesas, Vigo; Attendance: 150; Referees: Alpaidze, Berzkina (RUS)
28 July 2019; 09:00	Pettersen 10	(15–16)	Bannour 11	Complejo Deportivo de As Travesas, Vigo; Attendance: 150; Referees: Alpaidze, Berzkina (RUS)
28 July 2019; 09:00	3× (yellow card) 8× (suspension) 1× (red card)	Report	1× (suspension) 1× (red card)	Complejo Deportivo de As Travesas, Vigo; Attendance: 150; Referees: Alpaidze, Berzkina (RUS)

=== Fifth place game ===
28 July 2019; 11:30	Denmark	34–26	Slovenia	Complejo Deportivo de As Travesas, Vigo; Attendance: 200; Referees: Burgos, Delgado (ARG)
28 July 2019; 11:30	Jakobsen 8	(21–14)	Horvat, Horžen 6	Complejo Deportivo de As Travesas, Vigo; Attendance: 200; Referees: Burgos, Delgado (ARG)
28 July 2019; 11:30	1× (yellow card) 3× (suspension)	Report	2× (suspension)	Complejo Deportivo de As Travesas, Vigo; Attendance: 200; Referees: Burgos, Delgado (ARG)

=== Third place game ===
28 July 2019; 14:00	Egypt	37–27	Portugal	Complejo Deportivo de As Travesas, Vigo; Attendance: 720; Referees: Erdoğan, Özdeniz (TUR)
28 July 2019; 14:00	Dahroug 6	(17–15)	D. Silva, Vieira 6	Complejo Deportivo de As Travesas, Vigo; Attendance: 720; Referees: Erdoğan, Özdeniz (TUR)
28 July 2019; 14:00	1× (suspension)	Report	2× (yellow card) 1× (suspension)	Complejo Deportivo de As Travesas, Vigo; Attendance: 720; Referees: Erdoğan, Özdeniz (TUR)

=== Final ===
28 July 2019; 16:30	France	28–23	Croatia	Complejo Deportivo de As Travesas, Vigo; Attendance: 2,200; Referees: Álvarez, Bustamante (ESP)
28 July 2019; 16:30	Richert 6	(15–10)	Šarac 7	Complejo Deportivo de As Travesas, Vigo; Attendance: 2,200; Referees: Álvarez, Bustamante (ESP)
28 July 2019; 16:30	2× (yellow card) 4× (suspension)	Report	2× (yellow card) 5× (suspension) 1× (red card)	Complejo Deportivo de As Travesas, Vigo; Attendance: 2,200; Referees: Álvarez, Bustamante (ESP)

== Final ranking ==
Rank	Team
Gold medal	France
Silver medal	Croatia
Bronze medal	Egypt
4	Portugal
5	Denmark
6	Slovenia
7	Tunisia
8	Norway
9	Germany
10	Spain
11	Brazil
12	Sweden
13	Iceland
14	Serbia
15	Hungary
16	South Korea
17	Bahrain
18	Japan
19	Nigeria
20	Chile
21	Argentina
22	United States
23	Kosovo
24	Australia

== Statistics ==
=== Top goalscorers ===
Rank	Name	Team	Goals	Shots	%
1	Diogo Silva	Portugal	76	111	68
2	Gregor Ocvirk	Slovenia	72	105	69
3	Emil Lærke	Denmark	54	99	55
3	Mohamed Darmoul	Tunisia	54	89	61
5	Ivan Martinović	Croatia	53	86	62
6	Filip Vistorop	Croatia	48	82	59
7	Noah Gaudin	France	47	75	63
8	Gonzalo Pérez	Spain	43	59	73
9	Fran Mileta	Croatia	42	59	73
9	Josip Šarac	Croatia	42	60	70
9	Mathias Gidsel	Denmark	42	57	74

Source: IHF

=== Top goalkeepers ===
Rank	Name	Team	%	Saves	Shots
1	Andrej Trnavac	Serbia	39	15	38
2	Marc Hvidkjær	United States	39	7	18
3	Daniel Broto	Spain	38	24	64
4	Till Klimpke	Germany	36	70	194
5	Christoffer Bonde	Denmark	36	57	158
6	Hikaru Nakamura	Japan	36	54	152
7	Gauthier Ivah	France	35	45	128
8	Emil Imsgard	Norway	35	49	142
9	Viktor Hallgrímsson	Iceland	34	43	125
10	Ivan Ereš	Croatia	33	76	229

Source: IHF

== Awards ==
The MVP and all-star team were announced on 28 July 2019.

MVP

- (Croatia) Ivan Martinović

All-star team

- Goalkeeper: (France) Valentin Kieffer
- Right wing: (Croatia) Fran Mileta
- Right back: (Portugal) Diogo Silva
- Centre back: (France) Kyllian Villeminot
- Left back: (Denmark) Emil Lærke
- Left wing: (France) Dylan Nahi
- Pivot: (Portugal) Luís Frade
