= Croatia men's national junior handball team =

Croatia

Information
- Association: Croatian Handball Federation
- Coach: Igor Vori

Colours
1st	2nd

Results

IHF U-21 World Championship
- Appearances: 10 (First in 1997)
- Best result: (silver) Runners-Up : (2019)

European Junior Championship
- Appearances: 13 (First in 1996)
- Best result: (silver) Runners-Up : (2012)
- Last updated on Unknown.

The Croatia national junior handball team is the national under-21/20 handball team of Croatia. Controlled by the Croatian Handball Federation that is an affiliate of the International Handball Federation IHF as well as a member of the European Handball Federation EHF, The team represents Croatia in international matches.

== History ==
Despite being one of the strongest men's handball nations globally, Croatia have never managed to win the Crown of the IHF Men's Junior World Championship . Their best performance so far was Vice-Champions in the 2019 Edition in Spain.

== Statistics ==
=== IHF Junior World Championship record ===
Champions Runners up Third place Fourth place

Year	Round	Position	GP	W	D	L	GS	GA	GD
1977 (Sweden)	Didn't Qualify								
1979 (Sweden) / (Denmark)	Didn't Qualify								
1981 (Portugal)	Didn't Qualify								
1983 (Finland)	Didn't Qualify								
1985 (Italy)	Didn't Qualify								
1987 (Socialist Federal Republic of Yugoslavia)	Didn't Qualify								
1989 (Spain)	Didn't Qualify								
1991 (Greece)	Didn't Qualify								
1993 (Egypt)	Didn't Qualify								
1995 (Argentina)	Didn't Qualify								
1997 (Turkey)		10th place							
1999 (Qatar)		11th place							
2001 (Switzerland)		9th place							
2003 (Brazil)		5th place							
2005 (Hungary)	Didn't Qualify								
2007 (North Macedonia)		4th place							
2009 (Egypt)	Didn't Qualify								
2011 (Greece)	Didn't Qualify								
2013 (Bosnia and Herzegovina)		4th place							
2015 (Brazil)	Didn't Qualify								
2017 (Algeria)		10th place							
2019 (Spain)		2nd place							
2023 (Germany) (Greece)		8th place							
2025 (Poland)		12th place							
Total	10/24	0 Titles							

=== European Championship ===
Champions Runners up Third place Fourth place

European Junior Championship record
Year	Round	Position	GP	W	D	L	GS	GA	GD
(Romania) 1996		5th place							
(Austria) 1998		6th place							
(Greece) 2000		8th place							
(Poland) 2002		11th place							
(Latvia) 2004	Didn't Qualify								
(Austria) 2006		7th place							
(Romania) 2008		16th place							
(Slovakia) 2010		11th place							
(Turkey) 2012	Final	Runners-Up							
(Austria) 2014	Didn't Qualify								
(Denmark) 2016	Semi-finals	4th place							
(Slovenia) 2018		6th place							
(Portugal) 2022		14th place							
(Slovenia) 2024		11th place							
(Romania) 2026		16th place							
Total	13/15	0 Titles							

== Squads ==
- 2019 world championship squad: Ivan Ereš (1), Lovro Malec (4), Fran Mileta (5), Dominik Novak (6), Karlo Godec (9), Ivan Panjan (12), Filip Vistorop (13), Ivan Martinović (14), Tomislav Špruk (17), Adrian Miličević (18), Zvonimir Srna (19), Josip Vekić (20), Marko Račić (21), Daniel Papić (22), Josip Šarac (25) and Halil Jaganjac (45).
