= Noah Gaudin =

French handball player (born 1999)

Personal information
- Full name: Noah Theo Anthony Gaudin
- Nationality: French
- Born: 12 June 1999 (age 27) Hameln, Germany
- Height: 1.96 m (6 ft 5 in)

Sport
- Sport: Handball
- Position: Left/Centre back
- Current club: Paris Saint-Germain
- Number: 66

Senior clubs
- Years: Team
- 2016–2017: Sélestat AHB
- 2017–2020: Pays d'Aix UC
- 2018–2019: → Cesson Rennes Métropole HB
- 2020–2023: SønderjyskE
- 2023–2025: Skjern Håndbold
- 2025–: Paris Saint-Germain
National team
Years	Team	Apps	(Gls)
2025–	France	1	(0)
- Updated on 13 March 2025

Noah Theo Anthony Gaudin (12 June 1999) is a French handball player for the French club Paris Saint-Germain.

== Early life ==
He is born in Hameln, Germany, as his father Christian Gaudin was the goalkeeper of the local club VfL Hameln from 1997 to 1999. In 2003 he moved back to France.

== Career ==
Gaudin's senior debut came in the 2016-17 season for Sélestat AHB. In 2017 he joined Pays d'Aix UC.

For the 2018-19 season he was loaned out to Cesson Rennes Métropole HB.

In 2020 he signed for Danish side SønderjyskE. In 2022 he signed for league rivals Skjern Håndbold. In March 2025 he was called up to the French national team for the first time. This made him the first French national team player from the Danish Herrehåndboldligaen.

For the 2025-26 he returned to France and joined top team Paris Saint-Germain on a three year deal. The transfer was a record transfer for Skjern Håndbold.

== Private ==
His father Christian Guidan and his uncle Gilles Derot were also handballers. So is his cousin Théo Derot, as well as his brothers Clément and Thomas.
