= Igor Mandić (handballer) =

Bosnian handball player

Personal information
- Born: 16 October 1991 (age 35) Sarajevo, Bosnia and Herzegovina, Yugoslavia
- Height: 1.96 m (6 ft 5 in)

Sport
- Sport: Handball
- Position: Left back
- Current club: Sélestat Alsace Handball
- Number: 3

Senior clubs
- Years: Team
- -2010: RK Prijedor
- 2010-2013: RK Borac Banja Luka
- 2013-2014: RK Metalurg Skopje
- 2015-2021: Limoges Handball
- 2021-2022: Sélestat Alsace Handball
- 2022-2023: Riihimäki Cocks
- 2022-2023: Sélestat Alsace Handball
National team
Years	Team	Apps	(Gls)
–	Bosnia and Herzegovina	18	(3)
- Updated on 25 January 2024

Igor Mandić (born 16 October 1991) is a Bosnian handball player for French club Sélestat Alsace Handball and the Bosnian national team.

He represented Bosnia and Herzegovina at the 2020 and 2024 European Championships.
