= Josip Šarac =

Croatian handball player (born 1998)

Personal information
- Nationality: Croatian
- Born: 24 February 1998 (age 28) Ljubuški, BiH
- Height: 2.01 m (6 ft 7 in)

Sport
- Sport: Handball
- Position: Left back
- Current club: MOL Tatabánya KC
- Number: 13

Senior clubs
- Years: Team
- –2018: (Bosnia and Herzegovina) HRK Izviđač
- 2018–2021: (Slovenia) RK Celje
- 2021–2025: (Germany) Frisch Auf Göppingen
- 2025–: (Hungary) MOL Tatabánya KC
National team
| Years | Team | Apps | (Gls) |
| 2019– | Croatia | 39 | (42) |
Medal record
European Championship
| Silver medal – second place | 2020 Sweden/Austria/Norway |
Junior World Championship
| Silver medal – second place | 2019 Spain |
European Youth Championship
| Silver medal – second place | 2016 Croatia |
- Updated on 2 January 2025

Josip Šarac (born 24 February 1998) is a Croatian handball player for MOL Tatabánya KC and the Croatian national team.

== Career ==
=== Club ===
He played for HRK Izviđač in his hometown until 2018. In 2018, he moved to Slovenia to join RK Celje. Here he won the Slovenian First League twice (2019, 2020) and the Slovenian Supercup once (2019). In 2021, he moved to Germany to the Frisch Auf Göppingen team. With Frisch Auf Göppingen, he reached the semi-finals of the EHF European League in 2023 and achieved third place. He scored 75 goals in 17 matches in the EHF European League. In November 2024, it was announced that from the summer of 2025, he would transfer to the Hungarian first division MOL Tatabánya KC. In 2026, the team reached the final of the Hungarian Cup, but were defeated there by ONE Veszprém. Josip was unable to play in the final due to illness.

=== National team ===
In 2016, he won a silver medal at the Youth European Championship. He participated in the 2019 Junior World Championship, where Croatia won the silver medal. He participated in the 2020 European Men's Handball Championship, where Croatian national team won the silver medal. He also participated in the 2023 World Men's Handball Championship as a member of the Croatian national team. (9th place, 5 matches / 15 goals). He also participated in the 2024 Paris Olympics, where the Croatian national team finished 9th (5 matches / 2 goals).

== Honours ==
=== National team ===
- European Youth Championship
  - Silver: 2016
- Junior World Championship
  - Silver: 2019
- European Championship
  - Silver: 2020

=== Club ===
HRK Izviđač

- Premijer Liga
  - Gold: 2016, 2018
  - Silver: 2015, 2017
- Handball Cup of Bosnia and Herzegovina
  - Silver: 2016, 2017

RK Celje

- Slovenian First League
  - Gold: 2019, 2020
  - Bronze: 2021
- Slovenian Supercup
  - Gold: 2019
  - Silver: 2018

Frisch Auf Göppingen

- EHF European League
  - Bronze: 2023

MOL Tatabánya KC

- EHF European Cup:
  - Silver: 2026
- Nemzeti Bajnokság I:
  - Bronze: 2026
- Magyar Kupa
  - Silver: 2026
