= Christian Gaudin (handballer) =

French handball player (born 1967)

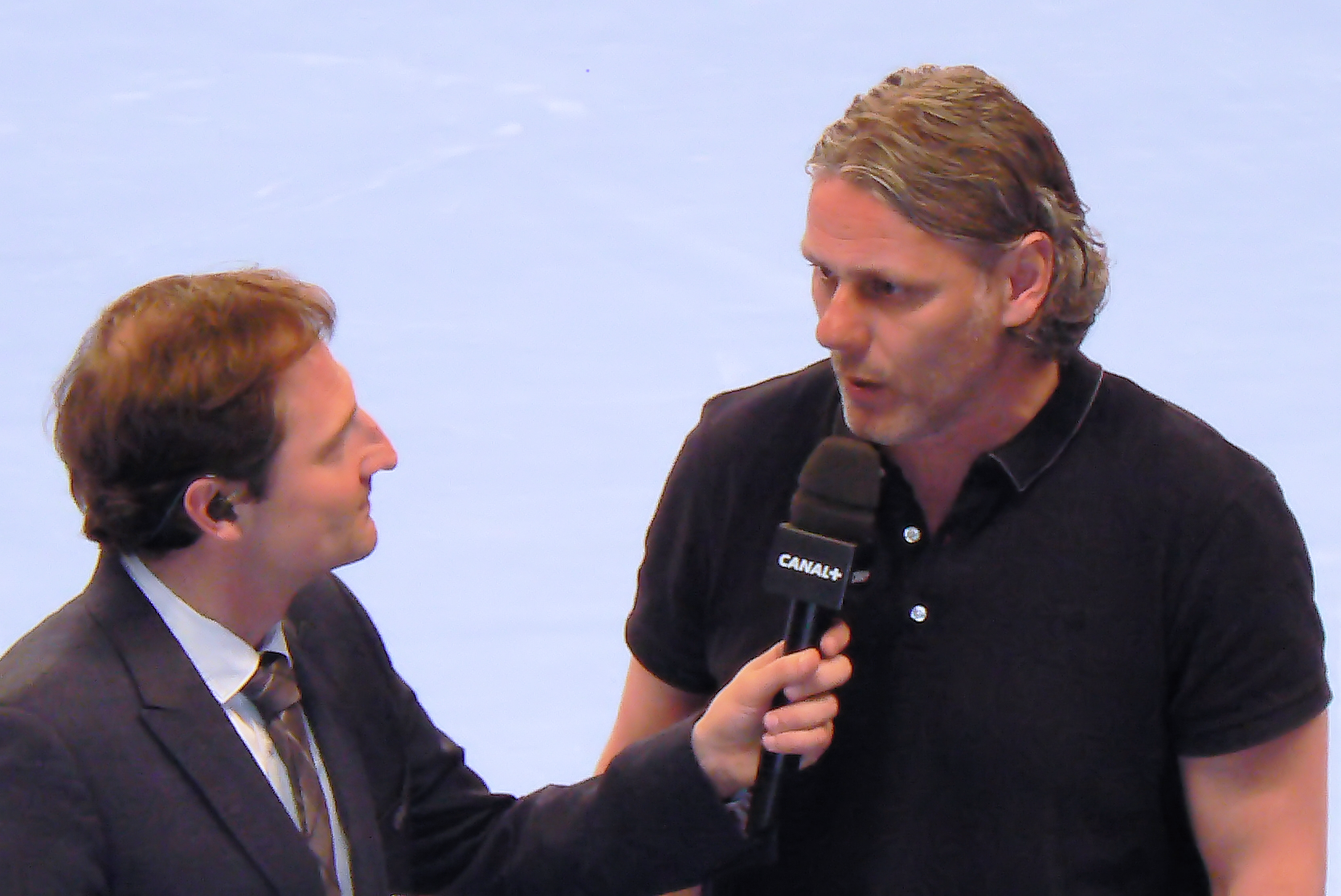

Personal information
- Nationality: French
- Born: 26 January 1967 (age 59) Chenôve, France
- Height: 1.97 m (6 ft 6 in)

Sport
- Sport: Handball
- Position: Goalkeeper
- Current club: Cesson Rennes MHB (manager)

Senior clubs
- Years: Team
- –1987: Cercle Dijon BHB
- 1987–1994: USAM Nîmes
- 1994–1995: US Créteil
- 1995–1997: Istres OPH
- 1997–1999: VfL Hameln
- 1999–2003: SC Magdeburg
- 2003–2006: Saint-Raphaël VHB
National team
Years	Team	Apps	(Gls)
1990–2002	France	247	(0)

Teams managed
- 2006–2014: Saint-Raphaël VHB
- 2014: Romania
- 2014: HSV Hamburg
- 2015–2017: Sélestat
- 2017–2018: HC Dobrogea Sud Constanța
- 2018–2019: Cesson Rennes MHB
Medal record
World Championship
Gold medal – first place	1995 Iceland	Team
Gold medal – first place	2001 France	Team
Silver medal – second place	1993 Sweden	Team
Bronze medal – third place	1997 France	Team

Christian Gaudin (born 26 January 1967) is a former French international handball player and current handball coach. He has served as the manager of the Romanian men's national team in 2014. As a player he was part of the France team that won the 1995 World Championship; the first time France ever won a major international tournament.

== Career ==
At club level he won the French championship in 1998, 1990, 1991 and 1993 and the French Cup in 1994 with USAM Nîmes. He then joined US Créteil, followed by Istres OPH. In 1997 he joined German team VfL Hameln. In 1999 he moved to SC Magdeburg, where he won the 2001 EHF Cup and Bundesliga, the EHF Champions League in 2002 and the EHF Champions Trophy in 2001 and 2002.

In 2003 he returned to France for personal reasons and joined second tier side Saint-Raphaël Var Handball.

=== National team ===
Gaudin played for the French national team from 1990 to 2002 and represented them at 5 European championship, 2 Olympics and 5 World Championships. In 1995 and 2001 he won World Championship gold medals.

== Coaching career ==
After his retirement as a player he became a coach at Saint-Raphaël. He was with them until 2014. From May 2014 he became the head coach of the Romanian men's national team.

In July 2014 he became the head coach at HSV Hamburg, replacing Martin Schwalb. In December 2014 he was fired from this position after losing 5 games in a row. He was replaced by his former assistant Jens Häusler.

In February 2015 he instead became the head coach at French team Sélestat AHB.

From July 2017 to October 2017 he was the head coach at Romanian team HC Dobrogea Sud Constanța.

In the summer of 2018 he was appointed head coach of Cesson Rennes MHB. He left this position in November 2019.

== Private ==
His son Noah Gaudin is also a professional handballer for PSG Handball. On the French national team and at USAM Nimes he played together with his brother-in-law, Gilles Derot, from 1987 to 1994. His nephew Théo Derot is also a handballer.

== Player achievements ==
- LNH Division 1:
  - Winner: 1988, 1990, 1991, 1993
- Pro D2:
  - Winner: 2004
- Coupe de France:
  - Winner: 1994
- Bundesliga:
  - Winner: 2001
- EHF Champions League:
  - Winner: 2002
- EHF Champions Trophy:
  - Winner: 2001, 2002
- EHF Cup:
  - Winner: 2001
- World Championship:
  - Gold Medalist: 1995, 2001
  - Silver Medalist: 1993
  - Bronze Medalist: 1997

== Coaching achievements ==
- LNH Division 1
  - Bronze Medalist: 2012
- Pro D2
  - Winner: 2007
- Coupe de France:
  - Semifinalist: 2003
- Coupe de la Ligue
  - Finalist: 2010, 2012, 2014
