= Fran Mileta =

Croatian handball player (born 2000)

Personal information
- Nationality: Croatian
- Born: 14 August 2000 (age 26) Labin, Croatia
- Height: 1.82 m (6 ft 0 in)

Sport
- Sport: Handball
- Position: Right wing
- Current club: Vojvodina
- Number: 7

Senior clubs
- Years: Team
- 2017–2019: Rudar Labin
- 2019–2023: Nexe Našice
- 2023–2024: Vinnhorst
- 2024–present: Vojvodina
National team
Years	Team	Apps	(Gls)
2019–present	Croatia	7	(7)
Medal record
Junior World Championship
Silver medal – second place	2019 Spain

Fran Mileta (born 14 August 2000) is a Croatian handball player for Vojvodina. He also represents the Croatia national team.

In October 2019 he became the first player born in the 21st century to appear on the list for the Croatian national team. He currently plays for RK Nexe Našice in the SEHA League and the EHF Cup.

With the Croatian national junior team he arrived fourth at the 2018 European U-18 Handball Championship, and second at the 2019 Junior World Handball Championship. He was in the all-star team of the 2019 World Championship as the best right wing.

== Honours ==
=== Club ===
Nexe

- Croatian Premier Handball League runner-up: 2020–21, 2021–22
- Croatian Cup runner-up: 2021

=== Individual ===
- Best right winger of the Men's Junior World Handball Championship: 2019
