= Théo Derot =

French handball player (born 1992)

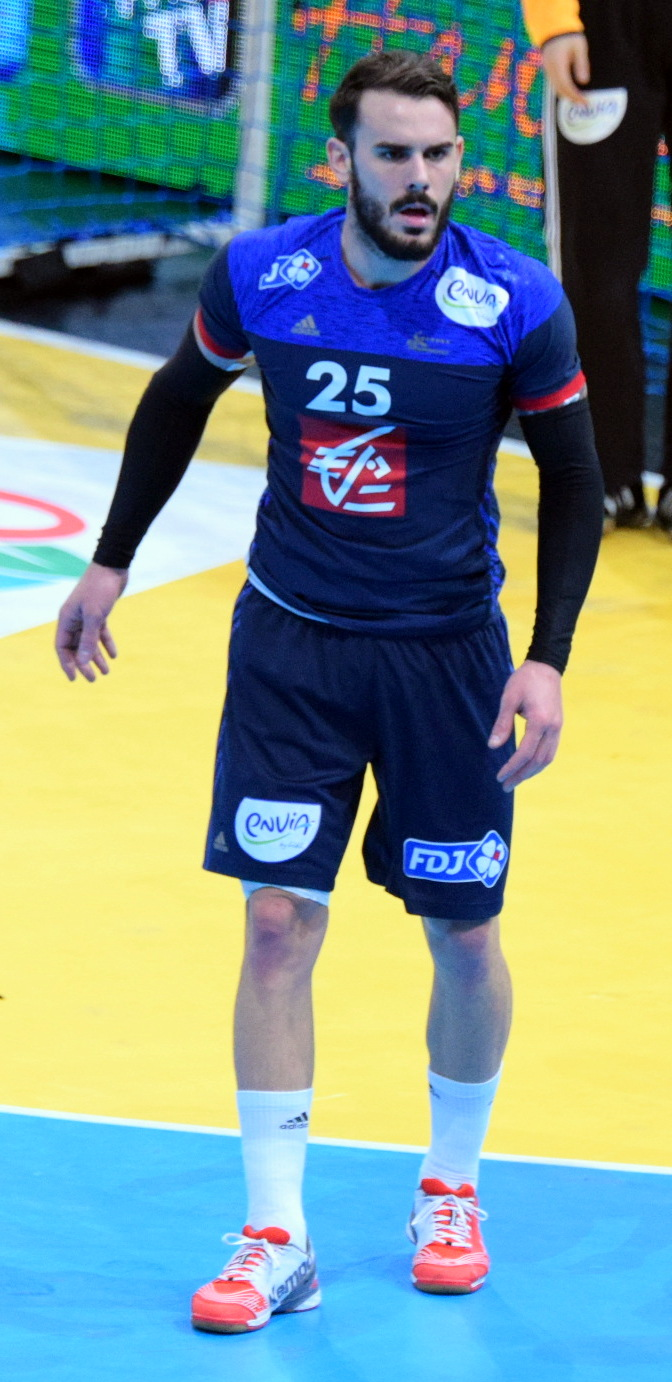

Personal information
- Nationality: French
- Born: 17 June 1992 (age 34) Nîmes, France
- Height: 1.93 m (6 ft 4 in)

Sport
- Sport: Handball
- Position: Left back
- Current club: Martigues Handball
- Number: 92

Senior clubs
- Years: Team
- –2015: (France) Istres OPH
- 2015–2017: (France) HBC Nantes
- 2017–2019: (France) Pays d'Aix UCH
- 2017–2019: (France) Istres Provence Handball
- 2021-: (France) Martigues Handball
National team
Years	Team	Apps	(Gls)
2016–	France	10	(11)
- Updated on 22 December 2021

Théo Derot (born 17 June 1992) is a French handball player who plays for Martigues Handball in the French third tier. He has previously feature for the French national team.

He participated at the 2016 European Men's Handball Championship, where France finished 5th.

He initially retired in 2019 while playing for Istres Provence Handball, but unretired in 2021 to join Martigues Handball.

== Private ==
Théo Derot comes from a handball family. His father Gilles Derot and his uncle Christian Gaudin were also handballers, as are his cousins Noah, Clement and Thomas Gaudin.
