= Sebastian Heymann =

German handball player (born 1998)

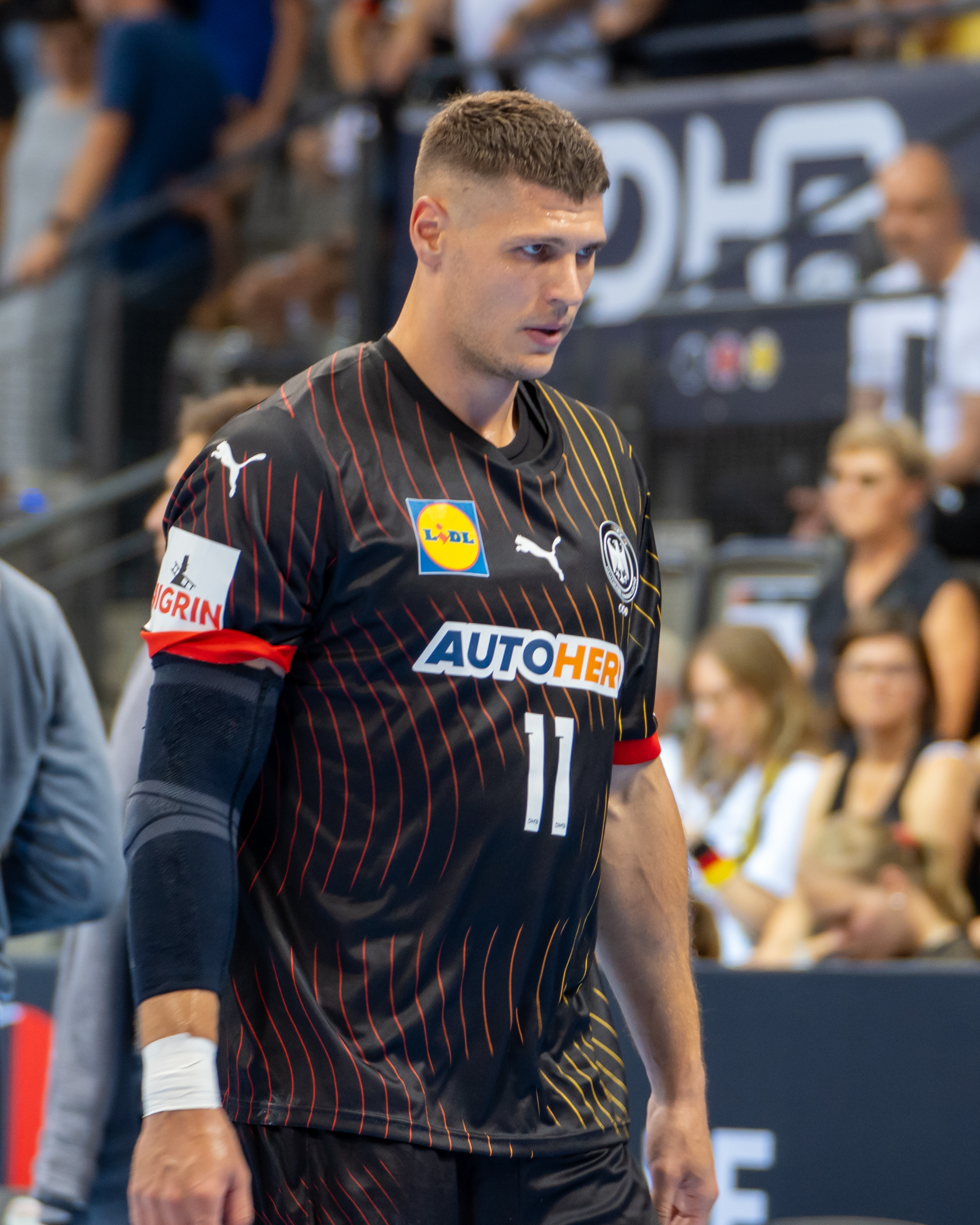
- Heymann in 2024

Personal information
- Nationality: German
- Born: 1 March 1998 (age 28) Heilbronn, Germany
- Height: 1.98 m (6 ft 6 in)

Sport
- Sport: Handball
- Position: Left back
- Current club: Rhein-Neckar Löwen
- Number: 13

Youth career
- Years: Team
- –2016: TSB Heilbronn-Horkheim

Senior clubs
- Years: Team
- 2016–2024: Frisch Auf Göppingen
- 2024–: Rhein-Neckar Löwen
National team
Years	Team	Apps	(Gls)
2019–	Germany	46	(92)
Medal record
Olympic Games
Silver medal – second place	2024 Paris	Team
U-18 European Championship
Bronze medal – third place	2016 Croatia
- Updated on 7 January 2025

Sebastian Heymann (born 1 March 1998) is a German handball player for Rhein-Neckar Löwen and the German national team.

== Career ==
Having starred for the youth teams at TSB Heilbronn-Horkheim, he was called up to play at the 2016 European Men's U-18 Handball Championship for Germany, where the team finished in third place and Heymann himself named in the tournament's all-star team. He later earned a professional contract with Bundesliga club Frisch Auf Göppingen, scoring six goals on his debut. That season, he was part of the Göppingen team that won the 2016–17 EHF Cup, defeating Füchse Berlin 30–22 in the final. In 2023, it was announced he would join Rhein-Neckar Löwen for the 2024–25 season.

Internationally, he has represented the senior national team of Germany at the 2022 and 2024 European Men's Handball Championships.
