= Sélestat Alsace Handball =

French handball club

- Full name: Sélestat Alsace Handball
- Short name: SAHB
- Founded: 1967; 59 years ago
- Arena: CSI Sélestat
- Capacity: 2,300
- President: Christian Omeyer
- Head coach: Laurent Busselier
- League: LNH Division 2
- Club colours
Home	Away

The Sélestat Alsace Handball is a French handball club based in Sélestat in Alsace and founded in 1967 under the name Sport Club de Sélestat before taking its current name on September 1, 2008. The club has played 23 seasons in D1 since 1990 and is playing since 2023 in LNH Division 2.

Location of Sélestat Alsace Handball

== History ==
The handball section of the Sport Club de Sélestat was created in 1967 by Germain Spatz and was enthusiastically received by young people in Sélestat. Subsequently, this enthusiasm allowed Selestadian handball players to climb all the levels to reach the top of departmental and regional competitions and finally reach in 1972 in the French National Championship 3 (4th national level at that time). The team remained at this level for 12 seasons, winning the title of champion of France of Nationale 3 in 1979. A season after the accession in 1984 in Nationale 2, the club went up in Nationale 1B in 1985. Finally, at the end of an exceptional 1989–1990 season, the club realized its dream by reaching division 1 and managing to stay there. The club entered the French 1st division championship during the 1990–1991 season.

In 1995, Sélestat Alsace Handball reached the Coupe de France final, losing to OM Vitrolles. The club has also won the Coupe d'Alsace six times. Despite maintaining one of the smaller budgets in top-tier French handball, the club operates a youth training academy that has produced players such as Thierry Omeyer, Mickaël Robin, Rock Feliho, and Sufyann Sayad.. Sélestat has also served as a development platform for international players looking to establish or revitalize their professional careers, including German international Volker Michel, Argentine Eric Gull, and Tunisian players Heykel Megannem and Issam Tej. Megannem and Tej were both named the French league's best center-half in 2005 and 2006, respectively, while playing for the club.

In 2008, the club took its independence by leaving the Sport Club de Sélestat to become the Sélestat Alsace Handball (SAHB). Then a major development for the club took place on June 6, 2011, with the creation of SASP Alsace Promo Handball, one of the shareholders and member of the supervisory board of which is Thierry Omeyer, in order to manage the professional sector of the club. Structured in this way, the SAHB aspires to offer Alsace, the East of France and all of its partners a media scene with a European dimension. Relegated to the division at the end of the 2008–2009 season, the club returned to the elite two years later. The club then evolves in the "soft underbelly" of the championship, far from both relegation and European places. The club thus finished 7th in 2012 and 8th in 2013, the third and fourth best results for the club in the league. The 2014 off season marked major changes in the club's sports management since, in contrast to the club's usual stability, eight starts and seven arrivals reshaped the club's workforce. Penultimate at the time of the international break, Jean-Luc Le Gall, club coach since 2008 and whose contract had been extended in the summer of 2014 until June 2016, was dimissed on February 2, 2015 and was replaced three days later by Christian Gaudin.

== Crest, colours, supporters ==
=== Naming history ===
Name	Period
Sport Club de Sélestat	1967–2008
Sélestat Alsace Handball	2008–present

=== Kits ===
HOME

2020–

AWAY
2013–2014	2020–

== Team ==
=== Current squad ===
Squad for the 2021–22 season

Sélestat Alsace Handball

Goalkeepers

- 1 (France) Clément Franck
- 12 (France) Hugo Kriszt
- 16 (Tunisia) Mehdi Harbaoui

Left Wingers

- 27 (France) Simon Jaeger
- 52 (France) Tanguy Thomas

Right Wingers

- 4 (France) Oreste Vescovo
- 77 (France) Steven George

Line players

- 5 (France) Téo Egermann
- 26 (France) Pierre Weber
- 60 (France) Virgile Pinchot

Central Backs

- 7 (France) Thibaud Valentin
- 19 (Norway) Hakon Ekren
- 23 (France) Hugo Van Ee

Left Backs

- 3 (Bosnia and Herzegovina) Igor Mandić
- 15 (France) Grégoire Plat
- 22 (Denmark) Toke Schröder
- 33 (France) Julien Da Silva

Right Backs

- 11 (France) Hugo Pimenta
- 14 (France) Thomas Capella

=== Transfers ===
Transfers for the 2026–27 season

Joining

- (Serbia) Miljan Ivanović (LB) from (France) JS Cherbourg
- (France) Romain Mathias (GK) from (France) Istres Provence Handball

Leaving

- (France) Léo Villain (GK) to (France) US Dunkerque HB
- (France) Steven George (RW) to (France) Molsheim OC

=== Transfer History ===
Transfers for the 2025–26 season

Joining

- (France) Thibault Chevalier (CB) from (France) Massy Essonne Handball

Leaving

- (Italy) Marco Mengon (CB) to (Germany) 1. VfL Potsdam

== Former club members ==
=== Notable former players ===
- (France) (Democratic Republic of the Congo) Frédéric Beauregard (2009–2017)
- (France) (Democratic Republic of the Congo) Rock Feliho (2000–2004)
- (France) Francis Franck (2003–2007, 2009–2010)
- (France) Yanis Lenne (2015–2017)
- (France) Julien Meyer (2015–2016)
- (France) Thierry Omeyer (1994–2000)
- (France) Mickaël Robin (2001–2008)
- (France) Marc Wiltberger (1999–2001)
- (Algeria) El Hadi Biloum (2006–2009)
- (Algeria) Yacinn Bouakaz (2003–2004)
- (Algeria) Sassi Boultif (2001–2003)
- (Algeria) Abdelkader Rahim (2016–2017)
- (Argentina) Eric Gull (2001–2003)
- (Belgium) Thomas Cauwenberghs (2017–2020)
- (Belgium) Simon Ooms (2018–2019)
- (Bosnia and Herzegovina) Duško Čelica (2014)
- (Bosnia and Herzegovina) Igor Mandić (2021–)
- (Croatia) Ivan Vida (2022–)
- (Germany) Volker Michel (2003–2004)
- (Iceland) Snorri Guðjónsson (2014–2015)
- (Montenegro) Stevan Vujović (2013–2015)
- (Romania) Radu Ghiță (2014–2015)
- (Russia) Igor Chumak (2001–2003)
- (Sweden) Richard Kappelin (2014–2015)
- (Tunisia) Hatem Haraket (2006–2008)
- (Tunisia) Mehdi Harbaoui (2020–)
- (Tunisia) Heykel Megannem (2002–2005)
- (Tunisia) Issam Tej (2003–2006)

=== Former coaches ===
Seasons	Coach	Country
1967–1977	Germain Spatz	(France)
1977–1978	Ljubomir Lazić	(Socialist Federal Republic of Yugoslavia)
1977–1978	Georges Grave	(France)
1978–1982	Gérard Grave	(France)
1982–1983	René Muller	(France)
1983–1992	Guy Petitgirard	(France)
1992–1993	Nicolas Gross	(France)
1993–1994	Philippe Carrara	(France)
1994–1996	Konrad Affolter	(Switzerland)
1996–2000	Radu Voina	(Romania)
2000–2001	Alain Quintallet	(France)
2001–2008	François Berthier	(France)
2008–2015	Jean-Luc Le Gall	(France)
2015–2017	Christian Gaudin	(France)
2017–	Christophe Viennet	(France)
