= Tomás Flores =

Chilean economist, academic and politician (1965–2025)

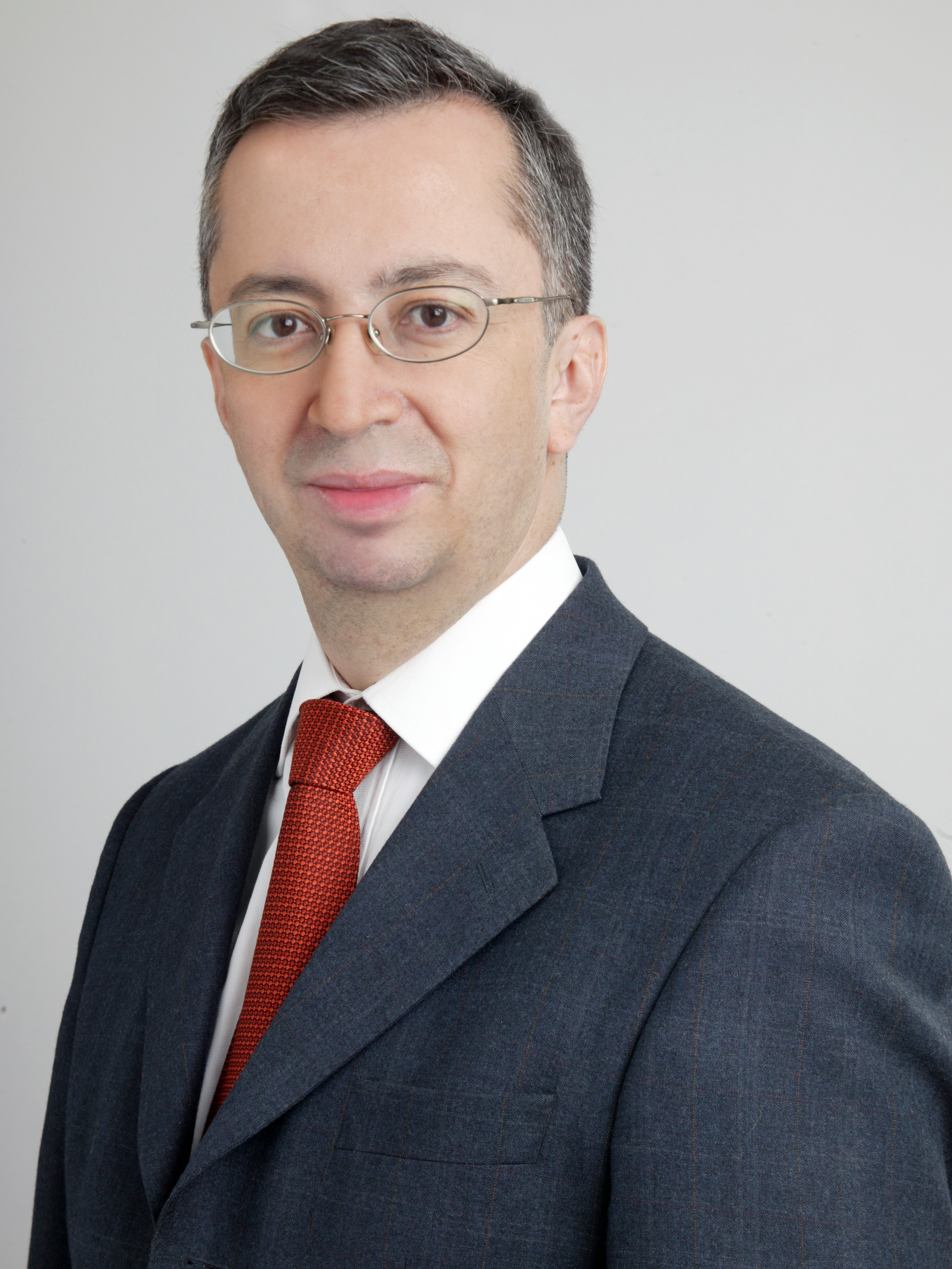
- Flores in 2010
- Born: April 22, 1965; Santiago, Chile
- Died: July 9, 2025 (aged 60); Santiago, Chile
- Occupation: politician

Tomás Osvaldo Flores Jaña (Spanish: [toˈmas ozˈβalðo ˈfloɾes ˈxaɲa]; April 22, 1965 – July 9, 2025) was a Chilean economist, academic and politician who was a member of the Independent Democratic Union (UDI). He was Undersecretary of Economy in the first government of Sebastián Piñera (2010–2014). Until his death, he served as senior economist at the Instituto Libertad y Desarrollo (LyD).

== Life and career ==
Flores studied at the Instituto O'Higgins de Rancagua and later pursued a degree in commercial engineering with a major in economics at the University of Chile. He held a master's degree in economics from the University of California, Los Angeles.

He was married to Perla Castillo Olguín and had three children.

Flores worked as a research assistant at the Faculty of Economics and Business at the University of Chile, researcher at the Chilean Copper Commission, and head of the Coordination Department of the Budget Directorate of the Ministry of Finance. From 1990 to 2009, he was a part of the staff of the Instituto Libertad y Desarrollo (LyD), a think tank affiliated with right-wing parties. During his tenure, he held the positions of director of the economic program and director of studies. He later served as a public policy advisor to LyD.

He taught at different universities. In 2009, he became dean of the Faculty of Economics and Business Administration at the Universidad Mayor.

Flores was a member of the Independent Democratic Union (UDI) and was appointed the Undersecretary of Economy by President-elect Sebastián Piñera in March 2010. He assumed office on March 11 of the same year. There were reports of his possible resignation from the post at the end of 2011, which did not materialize, and he served as the Undersecretary of Economy until March 11, 2014, completing Piñera's term in office.

On July 9, 2025, Tomas died from cancer in Santiago, at the age of 60.
