= Ivan Martinović (handballer) =

Croatian handball player (born 1999)

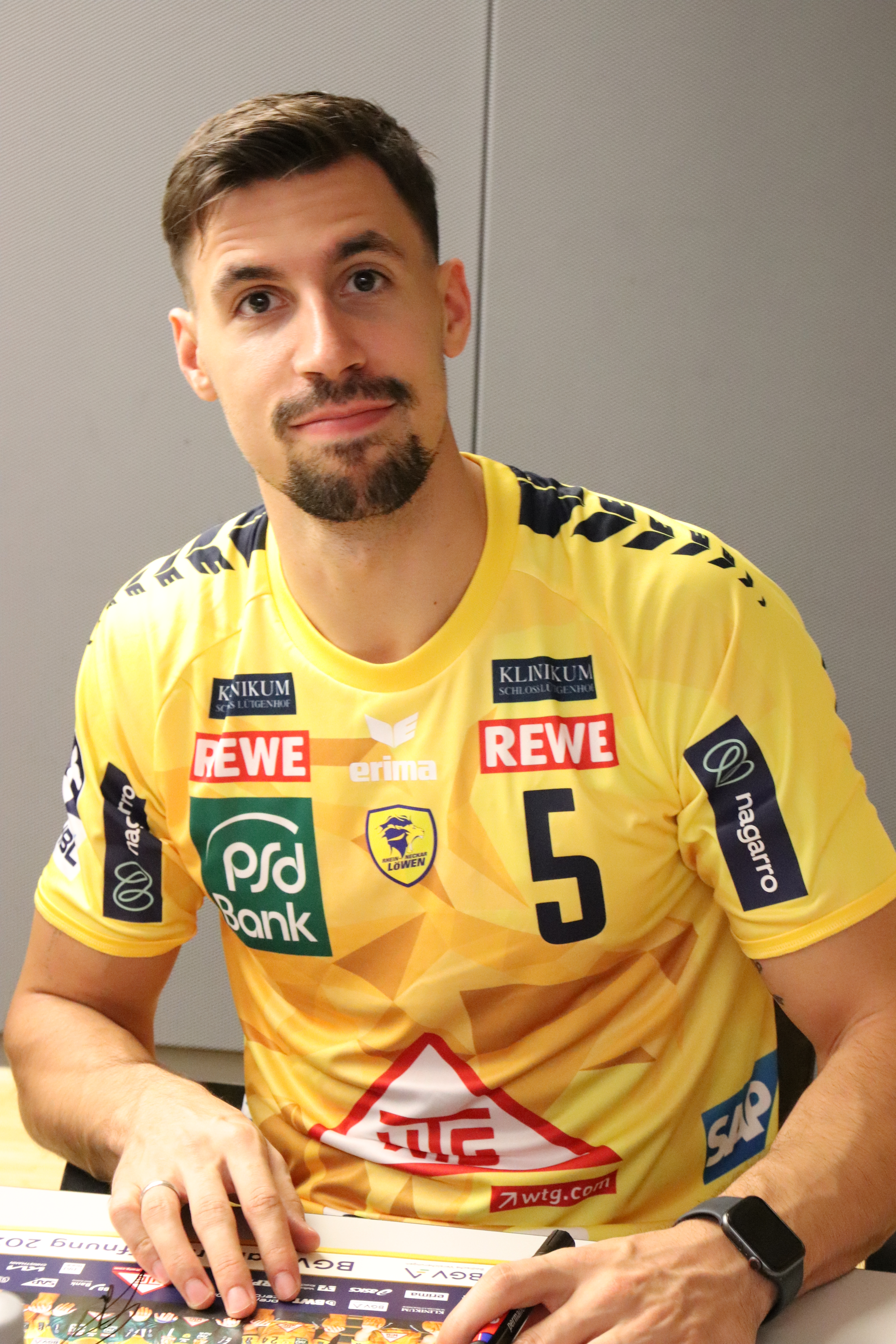

Personal information
- Nationality: Croatian
- Born: 6 January 1998 (age 28) Vienna, Austria
- Height: 1.94 m (6 ft 4 in)

Sport
- Sport: Handball
- Position: Right back
- Current club: ONE Veszprém
- Number: 5

Youth career
- Years: Team
- –: Handballclub Fivers Margareten

Senior clubs
- Years: Team
- 2015–2018: Handballclub Fivers Margareten
- 2018–2019: VfL Gummersbach
- 2019–2022: TSV Hannover-Burgdorf
- 2022–2024: MT Melsungen
- 2024–2025: Rhein-Neckar Löwen
- 2025–: ONE Veszprém
National team
Years	Team	Apps	(Gls)
2019–	Croatia	73	(339)
Medal record
World Championship
Silver medal – second place	2025 Croatia/Denmark/Norway
European Championship
Bronze medal – third place	2026 Denmark/Norway/Sweden
- Updated on 2 February 2026

Ivan Martinović (born 6 January 1998) is a Croatian handball player for ONE Veszprém and the Croatia national team.

== Career ==
Born in Austria, he began career in Vienna, where he won the 2018 Handball Liga Austria. He then made the move to the Handball-Bundesliga in Germany, but was relegated with VfL Gummersbach. He made his national debut in 2019. Having spent three years with TSV Hannover-Burgdorf, he joined MT Melsungen, but arranged a transfer to Rhein-Neckar Löwen for the following season after the signing of Dainis Krištopāns. He played a leading role for Croatia at the 2024 European Men's Handball Championship, but his tournament was cut short following an injury. With the Croatian national team he won the silver medal at the 2025 World Men's Handball Championship and the bronze medal at the 2026 European Men's Handball Championship, his first as the captain of the team.

== Individual awards ==
- Best right back of the World Championship: 2025
