= 2018 Asian Men's Junior Handball Championship =

2018 handball championship in Asia

Tournament details
- Host country: Oman
- Venue: 1 (in 1 host city)
- Dates: 16–26 July
- Teams: 14 (from 1 confederation)

Final positions
- Champions: South Korea (3rd title)
- Runners-up: Japan
- Third place: Bahrain
- Fourth place: Saudi Arabia

Tournament statistics
- Matches played: 51
- Goals scored: 2,988 (58.59 per match)

The 2018 Asian Men's Junior Handball Championship was the 16th edition of the championship, held from 16 to 26 July 2018 at Salalah, Oman, under the aegis of the Asian Handball Federation. It was the first time in history that the championship was organised in Oman by the Oman Handball Association. It also acted as the qualification tournament for the 2019 Men's Junior World Handball Championship. The top three teams from the championship directly qualified for the Junior World Championship, which was held in Spain.

== Draw ==
The draw was held on Friday, 13 April 2018 at 17:30 (UTC+04:00) in the City Seasons Hotel, Muscat, Oman.

=== Seeding ===
Teams were seeded according to the AHF COC regulations and rankings of the previous edition of the championship. Teams who had not participated in the previous edition were in Pot 4.

Pot 1	Pot 2	Pot 3	Pot 4
Qatar; Saudi Arabia; South Korea; Oman	Japan; Iraq; Bahrain; Iran	China; ~~Uzbekistan~~; India; ~~Palestine~~	Syria; Chinese Taipei; Yemen; Lebanon

Palestine and Uzbekistan were drawn in Group B and Group C respectively. They withdrew from the tournament after the draw due to unavoidable internal circumstances.

== Preliminary round ==
All times are local (UTC+4).

=== Group A ===
Pos	Team	Pld	W	D	L	GF	GA	GD	Pts	Qualification
1	South Korea	3	3	0	0	104	81	+23	6	Main round
2	Japan	3	2	0	1	79	54	+25	4	Main round
3	China	3	1	0	2	75	72	+3	2	9–14th placement
4	Lebanon	3	0	0	3	61	112	−51	0	9–14th placement

Source: AHF
Rules for classification: 1) Points; 2) Head-to-head points; 3) Head-to-head goal difference; 4) Head-to-head goals scored; 5) Goal difference; 6) Goals scored; 7) Draw.

16 July 2018; 13:00	Lebanon	31–45	South Korea	Al-Saada Indoor Hall, Salalah; Referees: Al-Dossary, Al-Marri (KSA)
16 July 2018; 13:00	Mansour 16	(15–23)	Shin J. 8	Al-Saada Indoor Hall, Salalah; Referees: Al-Dossary, Al-Marri (KSA)
16 July 2018; 13:00	7× (suspension) 1× (red card)		3× (yellow card) 4× (suspension)	Al-Saada Indoor Hall, Salalah; Referees: Al-Dossary, Al-Marri (KSA)

16 July 2018; 16:30	China	15–22	Japan	Al-Saada Indoor Hall, Salalah; Referees: Covalciuc, Covalciuc (MDA)
16 July 2018; 16:30	Huang 4	(8–8)	Klampt, Takano 4	Al-Saada Indoor Hall, Salalah; Referees: Covalciuc, Covalciuc (MDA)
16 July 2018; 16:30	2× (yellow card) 4× (suspension)		2× (yellow card) 5× (suspension)	Al-Saada Indoor Hall, Salalah; Referees: Covalciuc, Covalciuc (MDA)

17 July 2018; 17:00	South Korea	32–27	China	Al-Saada Indoor Hall, Salalah; Referees: Hussein, Imran (IRQ)
17 July 2018; 17:00	Kang, Kim R. 7	(16–14)	Jin 7	Al-Saada Indoor Hall, Salalah; Referees: Hussein, Imran (IRQ)
17 July 2018; 17:00	1× (yellow card) 1× (suspension)		2× (yellow card) 3× (suspension)	Al-Saada Indoor Hall, Salalah; Referees: Hussein, Imran (IRQ)

17 July 2018; 18:45	Japan	34–12	Lebanon	Al-Saada Indoor Hall, Salalah; Referees: Al-Wahibi, Al-Shahi (OMA)
17 July 2018; 18:45	Nishi 10	(20–6)	Chahine, Mansour 4	Al-Saada Indoor Hall, Salalah; Referees: Al-Wahibi, Al-Shahi (OMA)
17 July 2018; 18:45	3× (yellow card) 2× (suspension)		3× (yellow card) 4× (suspension)	Al-Saada Indoor Hall, Salalah; Referees: Al-Wahibi, Al-Shahi (OMA)

18 July 2018; 13:30	Lebanon	18–33	China	Al-Saada Indoor Hall, Salalah; Referees: Al-Wahibir, Al-Shahi (OMA)
18 July 2018; 13:30	Mansour 6	(6–16)	Huang 8	Al-Saada Indoor Hall, Salalah; Referees: Al-Wahibir, Al-Shahi (OMA)
18 July 2018; 13:30	1× (yellow card) 3× (suspension)		4× (yellow card) 7× (suspension)	Al-Saada Indoor Hall, Salalah; Referees: Al-Wahibir, Al-Shahi (OMA)

18 July 2018; 17:00	Japan	23–27	South Korea	Al-Saada Indoor Hall, Salalah; Referees: Hussein, Imran (IRQ)
18 July 2018; 17:00	Tokuda 8	(8–14)	Shin J. 9	Al-Saada Indoor Hall, Salalah; Referees: Hussein, Imran (IRQ)
18 July 2018; 17:00	3× (yellow card) 3× (suspension)		1× (yellow card) 2× (suspension)	Al-Saada Indoor Hall, Salalah; Referees: Hussein, Imran (IRQ)

=== Group B ===
Pos	Team	Pld	W	D	L	GF	GA	GD	Pts	Qualification
1	Qatar	2	2	0	0	62	47	+15	4	Main round
2	Iraq	2	1	0	1	66	48	+18	2	Main round
3	Syria	2	0	0	2	48	81	−33	0	9–14th placement

Source: AHF
Rules for classification: 1) Points; 2) Head-to-head points; 3) Head-to-head goal difference; 4) Head-to-head goals scored; 5) Goal difference; 6) Goals scored; 7) Draw.

16 July 2018; 14:45	Syria	26–36	Qatar	Al-Saada Indoor Hall, Salalah; Referees: Al-Zayyat, Awwad (JOR)
16 July 2018; 14:45	Al-Azem 7	(9–21)	Al-Kharusi 5	Al-Saada Indoor Hall, Salalah; Referees: Al-Zayyat, Awwad (JOR)
16 July 2018; 14:45	2× (yellow card) 2× (suspension)		3× (yellow card) 6× (suspension)	Al-Saada Indoor Hall, Salalah; Referees: Al-Zayyat, Awwad (JOR)

17 July 2018; 10:00	Iraq	45–22	Syria	Al-Saada Indoor Hall, Salalah; Referees: Tavakoli, Valadkhanian (IRI)
17 July 2018; 10:00	Al-Bufaradi 9	(24–13)	Al-Bashouri 6	Al-Saada Indoor Hall, Salalah; Referees: Tavakoli, Valadkhanian (IRI)
17 July 2018; 10:00	3× (yellow card) 9× (suspension)		3× (yellow card) 5× (suspension) 1× (red card)	Al-Saada Indoor Hall, Salalah; Referees: Tavakoli, Valadkhanian (IRI)

18 July 2018; 11:45	Iraq	21–26	Qatar	Al-Saada Indoor Hall, Salalah; Referees: Koo, Lee (KOR)
18 July 2018; 11:45	Al-Mashhadani 6	(9–11)	Al-Mughanni, Gačević 4	Al-Saada Indoor Hall, Salalah; Referees: Koo, Lee (KOR)
18 July 2018; 11:45	3× (yellow card) 1× (red card)		2× (yellow card) 3× (suspension)	Al-Saada Indoor Hall, Salalah; Referees: Koo, Lee (KOR)

=== Group C ===
Pos	Team	Pld	W	D	L	GF	GA	GD	Pts	Qualification
1	Bahrain	2	2	0	0	60	44	+16	4	Main round
2	Saudi Arabia	2	1	0	1	62	52	+10	2	Main round
3	Chinese Taipei	2	0	0	2	53	79	−26	0	9–14th placement

Source: AHF
Rules for classification: 1) Points; 2) Head-to-head points; 3) Head-to-head goal difference; 4) Head-to-head goals scored; 5) Goal difference; 6) Goals scored; 7) Draw.

16 July 2018; 11:15	Chinese Taipei	30–41	Saudi Arabia	Al-Saada Indoor Hall, Salalah; Referees: Koo, Lee (KOR)
16 July 2018; 11:15	Chen 6	(16–20)	Al-Mesallem 9	Al-Saada Indoor Hall, Salalah; Referees: Koo, Lee (KOR)
16 July 2018; 11:15	2× (yellow card) 1× (red card)		2× (yellow card) 5× (suspension)	Al-Saada Indoor Hall, Salalah; Referees: Koo, Lee (KOR)

17 July 2018; 11:45	Bahrain	38–23	Chinese Taipei	Al-Saada Indoor Hall, Salalah; Referees: Covalciuc, Covalciuc (MDA)
17 July 2018; 11:45	Ah. Ali 10	(18–14)	Jou 6	Al-Saada Indoor Hall, Salalah; Referees: Covalciuc, Covalciuc (MDA)
17 July 2018; 11:45	3× (yellow card) 3× (suspension)		3× (yellow card) 6× (suspension)	Al-Saada Indoor Hall, Salalah; Referees: Covalciuc, Covalciuc (MDA)

18 July 2018; 15:15	Bahrain	22–21	Saudi Arabia	Al-Saada Indoor Hall, Salalah; Referees: Covalciuc, Covalciuc (MDA)
18 July 2018; 15:15	Ah. Ali 9	(10–10)	Al-Mesallem 7	Al-Saada Indoor Hall, Salalah; Referees: Covalciuc, Covalciuc (MDA)
18 July 2018; 15:15	2× (yellow card) 2× (suspension)		4× (yellow card) 3× (suspension)	Al-Saada Indoor Hall, Salalah; Referees: Covalciuc, Covalciuc (MDA)

=== Group D ===
Pos	Team	Pld	W	D	L	GF	GA	GD	Pts	Qualification
1	Iran	3	3	0	0	123	53	+70	6	Main round
2	Oman (H)	3	2	0	1	91	91	0	4	Main round
3	India	3	1	0	2	91	110	−19	2	9–14th placement
4	Yemen	3	0	0	3	71	122	−51	0	9–14th placement

Source: AHF
Rules for classification: 1) Points; 2) Head-to-head points; 3) Head-to-head goal difference; 4) Head-to-head goals scored; 5) Goal difference; 6) Goals scored; 7) Draw.
(H) Hosts

16 July 2018; 09:30	India	17–48	Iran	Al-Saada Indoor Hall, Salalah; Referees: Usui, Kawai (JPN)
16 July 2018; 09:30	Ankit 5	(8–23)	Taheri 7	Al-Saada Indoor Hall, Salalah; Referees: Usui, Kawai (JPN)
16 July 2018; 09:30	1× (yellow card) 4× (suspension)		3× (yellow card) 3× (suspension)	Al-Saada Indoor Hall, Salalah; Referees: Usui, Kawai (JPN)

16 July 2018; 19:00	Yemen	28–36	Oman	Al-Saada Indoor Hall, Salalah; Referees: Ke, Li (CHN)
16 July 2018; 19:00	Rezq 11	(15–21)	Al-Hasani 8	Al-Saada Indoor Hall, Salalah; Referees: Ke, Li (CHN)
16 July 2018; 19:00	6× (suspension) 1× (red card)		3× (yellow card) 3× (suspension)	Al-Saada Indoor Hall, Salalah; Referees: Ke, Li (CHN)

17 July 2018; 13:30	Oman	38–37	India	Al-Saada Indoor Hall, Salalah; Referees: Al-Dossary, Al-Marri (KSA)
17 July 2018; 13:30	Al-Hasani 14	(17–21)	Sunny 10	Al-Saada Indoor Hall, Salalah; Referees: Al-Dossary, Al-Marri (KSA)
17 July 2018; 13:30	3× (yellow card) 6× (suspension)		2× (yellow card) 3× (suspension)	Al-Saada Indoor Hall, Salalah; Referees: Al-Dossary, Al-Marri (KSA)

17 July 2018; 15:15	Iran	49–19	Yemen	Al-Saada Indoor Hall, Salalah; Referees: Usui, Kawai (JPN)
17 July 2018; 15:15	Falavarjani, Yahyaye 7	(29–6)	Derhem, Othman 6	Al-Saada Indoor Hall, Salalah; Referees: Usui, Kawai (JPN)
17 July 2018; 15:15	3× (yellow card) 6× (suspension)		2× (yellow card) 8× (suspension) 1× (red card)	Al-Saada Indoor Hall, Salalah; Referees: Usui, Kawai (JPN)

18 July 2018; 10:00	Yemen	24–37	India	Al-Saada Indoor Hall, Salalah; Referees: Ke, Li (CHN)
18 July 2018; 10:00	Othman 10	(13–19)	Ankit 9	Al-Saada Indoor Hall, Salalah; Referees: Ke, Li (CHN)
18 July 2018; 10:00	3× (yellow card) 3× (suspension)		1× (yellow card) 2× (suspension)	Al-Saada Indoor Hall, Salalah; Referees: Ke, Li (CHN)

18 July 2018; 18:45	Iran	26–17	Oman	Al-Saada Indoor Hall, Salalah; Referees: Al-Zayyat, Awwad (JOR)
18 July 2018; 18:45	Behnamnia 6	(10–11)	Al-Maashari 6	Al-Saada Indoor Hall, Salalah; Referees: Al-Zayyat, Awwad (JOR)
18 July 2018; 18:45	1× (yellow card) 6× (suspension)		2× (yellow card) 4× (suspension) 1× (red card) 1×	Al-Saada Indoor Hall, Salalah; Referees: Al-Zayyat, Awwad (JOR)

== 9–14th placement matches ==
=== Group III ===
Pos	Team	Pld	W	D	L	GF	GA	GD	Pts
9	China	5	5	0	0	188	124	+64	10
10	Chinese Taipei	5	4	0	1	214	161	+53	8
11	India	5	3	0	2	186	192	−6	6
12	Lebanon	5	2	0	3	165	178	−13	4
13	Syria	5	1	0	4	152	179	−27	2
14	Yemen	5	0	0	5	150	221	−71	0

Source: AHF
Rules for classification: 1) Points; 2) Head-to-head points; 3) Head-to-head goal difference; 4) Head-to-head goals scored; 5) Goal difference; 6) Goals scored; 7) Draw.

20 July 2018; 09:00	Chinese Taipei	41–38	India	Al-Saada Indoor Hall, Salalah
20 July 2018; 09:00	Hung 12	(23–16)	Naveen 9	Al-Saada Indoor Hall, Salalah
20 July 2018; 09:00	3× (yellow card) 6× (suspension)		2× (yellow card) 2× (suspension)	Al-Saada Indoor Hall, Salalah

20 July 2018; 10:45	Syria	25–40	Lebanon	Al-Saada Indoor Hall, Salalah
20 July 2018; 10:45	Al-Bashouri 8	(11–23)	Mansour 13	Al-Saada Indoor Hall, Salalah
20 July 2018; 10:45	3× (yellow card) 4× (suspension) 1× (red card)		2× (yellow card) 6× (suspension)	Al-Saada Indoor Hall, Salalah

20 July 2018; 12:30	China	47–26	Yemen	Al-Saada Indoor Hall, Salalah
20 July 2018; 12:30	Jin 8	(23–14)	Othman 11	Al-Saada Indoor Hall, Salalah
20 July 2018; 12:30	3× (yellow card) 4× (suspension)		2× (yellow card) 3× (suspension) 2× (red card)	Al-Saada Indoor Hall, Salalah

21 July 2018; 09:00	Syria	30–45	Chinese Taipei	Al-Saada Indoor Hall, Salalah; Referees: Hussein, Imran (IRQ)
21 July 2018; 09:00	Al-Masri 7	(10–19)	Li 7	Al-Saada Indoor Hall, Salalah; Referees: Hussein, Imran (IRQ)
21 July 2018; 09:00	2× (yellow card) 7× (suspension) 1× (red card)		1× (yellow card) 4× (suspension)	Al-Saada Indoor Hall, Salalah; Referees: Hussein, Imran (IRQ)

21 July 2018; 10:45	Lebanon	13–30	China	Al-Saada Indoor Hall, Salalah; Referees: Al-Wahibi, Al-Shahi (OMA)
21 July 2018; 10:45	Assaad, Kobeissi 3	(6–13)	Jin 6	Al-Saada Indoor Hall, Salalah; Referees: Al-Wahibi, Al-Shahi (OMA)
21 July 2018; 10:45	2× (yellow card) 4× (suspension)		2× (yellow card) 1× (suspension)	Al-Saada Indoor Hall, Salalah; Referees: Al-Wahibi, Al-Shahi (OMA)

21 July 2018; 12:30	India	36–32	Yemen	Al-Saada Indoor Hall, Salalah; Referees: Tavakoli, Valadkhanian
21 July 2018; 12:30	Naveen 9	(20–12)	Othman 7	Al-Saada Indoor Hall, Salalah; Referees: Tavakoli, Valadkhanian
21 July 2018; 12:30	3× (yellow card) 5× (suspension)		3× (yellow card) 7× (suspension)	Al-Saada Indoor Hall, Salalah; Referees: Tavakoli, Valadkhanian

22 July 2018; 09:00	China	50–31	India	Al-Saada Indoor Hall, Salalah
22 July 2018; 09:00	Huang 11	(27–18)	Sunny 7	Al-Saada Indoor Hall, Salalah
22 July 2018; 09:00	3× (yellow card) 4× (suspension)		1× (yellow card) 2× (suspension)	Al-Saada Indoor Hall, Salalah

22 July 2018; 10:45	Yemen	25–36	Syria	Al-Saada Indoor Hall, Salalah
22 July 2018; 10:45	Othman, Rezq 5	(14–21)	Al-Bashouri 7	Al-Saada Indoor Hall, Salalah
22 July 2018; 10:45	1× (yellow card) 3× (suspension)		2× (yellow card) 5× (suspension)	Al-Saada Indoor Hall, Salalah

22 July 2018; 12:30	Chinese Taipei	41–35	Lebanon	Al-Saada Indoor Hall, Salalah
22 July 2018; 12:30	Chang 9	(24–18)	Mansour 15	Al-Saada Indoor Hall, Salalah
22 July 2018; 12:30	3× (yellow card) 4× (suspension)		3× (yellow card) 2× (suspension) 1×	Al-Saada Indoor Hall, Salalah

24 July 2018; 09:00	Lebanon	44–39	Yemen	Al-Saada Indoor Hall, Salalah
24 July 2018; 09:00		(22–16)		Al-Saada Indoor Hall, Salalah
24 July 2018; 09:00	1× (yellow card) 2× (suspension)		3× (yellow card) 1× (suspension)	Al-Saada Indoor Hall, Salalah

24 July 2018; 10:45	Chinese Taipei	29–30	China	Al-Saada Indoor Hall, Salalah
24 July 2018; 10:45		(12–16)		Al-Saada Indoor Hall, Salalah
24 July 2018; 10:45	3× (yellow card) 5× (suspension)		4× (yellow card) 4× (suspension)	Al-Saada Indoor Hall, Salalah

24 July 2018; 12:30	India	38–36	Syria	Al-Saada Indoor Hall, Salalah
24 July 2018; 12:30		(20–22)		Al-Saada Indoor Hall, Salalah
24 July 2018; 12:30	2× (yellow card) 3× (suspension)		3× (yellow card) 2× (suspension)	Al-Saada Indoor Hall, Salalah

25 July 2018; 10:45	Yemen	28–58	Chinese Taipei	Al-Saada Indoor Hall, Salalah
25 July 2018; 10:45	Rezq 10	(12–30)	Jou 8	Al-Saada Indoor Hall, Salalah
25 July 2018; 10:45	1× (yellow card) 5× (suspension)		3× (yellow card) 1× (suspension)	Al-Saada Indoor Hall, Salalah

26 July 2018; 12:45	India	43–33	Lebanon	Al-Saada Indoor Hall, Salalah; Referees: Ke, Li (CHN)
26 July 2018; 12:45	Ankit, Sunny 10	(20–14)	Al-Oukaibe 7	Al-Saada Indoor Hall, Salalah; Referees: Ke, Li (CHN)
26 July 2018; 12:45	3× (yellow card) 4× (suspension)		1× (yellow card) 3× (suspension)	Al-Saada Indoor Hall, Salalah; Referees: Ke, Li (CHN)

26 July 2018; 14:30	China	31–25	Syria	Al-Saada Indoor Hall, Salalah; Referees: Tavakoli, Valadkhanian (IRI)
26 July 2018; 14:30	Li 8	(16–12)	Al-Azem 7	Al-Saada Indoor Hall, Salalah; Referees: Tavakoli, Valadkhanian (IRI)
26 July 2018; 14:30	2× (yellow card) 6× (suspension)		4× (yellow card) 4× (suspension)	Al-Saada Indoor Hall, Salalah; Referees: Tavakoli, Valadkhanian (IRI)

== Main round ==
=== Group I ===
Pos	Team	Pld	W	D	L	GF	GA	GD	Pts	Qualification
1	South Korea	3	3	0	0	103	69	+34	6	Semifinals
2	Bahrain	3	2	0	1	84	72	+12	4	Semifinals
3	Iraq	3	1	0	2	80	87	−7	2	5th place game
4	Oman (H)	3	0	0	3	62	101	−39	0	7th place game

Source: AHF
Rules for classification: 1) Points; 2) Head-to-head points; 3) Head-to-head goal difference; 4) Head-to-head goals scored; 5) Goal difference; 6) Goals scored; 7) Draw.
(H) Hosts

20 July 2018; 18:10	Iraq	22–29	Bahrain	Al-Saada Indoor Hall, Salalah; Referees: Al-Zayyat, Awwad (JOR)
20 July 2018; 18:10	Al-Sahlani 6	(9–15)	H. Ali 6	Al-Saada Indoor Hall, Salalah; Referees: Al-Zayyat, Awwad (JOR)
20 July 2018; 18:10	4× (yellow card) 8× (suspension)		2× (yellow card) 4× (suspension)	Al-Saada Indoor Hall, Salalah; Referees: Al-Zayyat, Awwad (JOR)

20 July 2018; 19:55	South Korea	37–20	Oman	Al-Saada Indoor Hall, Salalah; Referees: Tavakoli, Valadkhanian (IRI)
20 July 2018; 19:55	Lee 6	(20–8)	Al-Araimi 6	Al-Saada Indoor Hall, Salalah; Referees: Tavakoli, Valadkhanian (IRI)
20 July 2018; 19:55	2× (yellow card) 1× (suspension)		4× (yellow card) 11× (suspension) 2× (red card)	Al-Saada Indoor Hall, Salalah; Referees: Tavakoli, Valadkhanian (IRI)

21 July 2018; 18:00	Iraq	34–24	Oman	Al-Saada Indoor Hall, Salalah
21 July 2018; 18:00		(12–15)		Al-Saada Indoor Hall, Salalah
21 July 2018; 18:00	2× (yellow card) 6× (suspension)		2× (yellow card) 1× (suspension)	Al-Saada Indoor Hall, Salalah

21 July 2018; 20:10	South Korea	32–25	Bahrain	Al-Saada Indoor Hall, Salalah; Referees: Al-Zayyat, Awwad (JOR)
21 July 2018; 20:10	Kang 9	(14–11)	Ab. Ali, Al-Maqabi 6	Al-Saada Indoor Hall, Salalah; Referees: Al-Zayyat, Awwad (JOR)
21 July 2018; 20:10	3× (yellow card) 4× (suspension)		2× (yellow card) 4× (suspension)	Al-Saada Indoor Hall, Salalah; Referees: Al-Zayyat, Awwad (JOR)

22 July 2018; 17:45	Oman	18–30	Bahrain	Al-Saada Indoor Hall, Salalah; Referees: Hussein, Imran (IRQ)
22 July 2018; 17:45	Al-Maashari 6	(8–14)	three players 5	Al-Saada Indoor Hall, Salalah; Referees: Hussein, Imran (IRQ)
22 July 2018; 17:45	2× (yellow card) 4× (suspension)		3× (yellow card) 6× (suspension)	Al-Saada Indoor Hall, Salalah; Referees: Hussein, Imran (IRQ)

22 July 2018; 19:30	Iraq	24–34	South Korea	Al-Saada Indoor Hall, Salalah; Referees: Al-Wahibi, Al-Shahi (OMA)
22 July 2018; 19:30	Sabeeh 4	(12–16)	Kim R. 8	Al-Saada Indoor Hall, Salalah; Referees: Al-Wahibi, Al-Shahi (OMA)
22 July 2018; 19:30	2× (yellow card) 5× (suspension)		2× (yellow card)	Al-Saada Indoor Hall, Salalah; Referees: Al-Wahibi, Al-Shahi (OMA)

=== Group II ===
Pos	Team	Pld	W	D	L	GF	GA	GD	Pts	Qualification
1	Japan	3	2	1	0	68	59	+9	5	Semifinals
2	Saudi Arabia	3	2	0	1	72	67	+5	4	Semifinals
3	Iran	3	0	2	1	69	75	−6	2	5th place game
4	Qatar	3	0	1	2	60	68	−8	1	7th place game

Source: AHF
Rules for classification: 1) Points; 2) Head-to-head points; 3) Head-to-head goal difference; 4) Head-to-head goals scored; 5) Goal difference; 6) Goals scored; 7) Draw.

20 July 2018; 14:25	Qatar	17–19	Saudi Arabia	Al-Saada Indoor Hall, Salalah
20 July 2018; 14:25	Gačević, Mohammad 4	(8–10)	Al-Mesallem 7	Al-Saada Indoor Hall, Salalah
20 July 2018; 14:25	3× (yellow card) 5× (suspension)		3× (yellow card) 3× (suspension)	Al-Saada Indoor Hall, Salalah

20 July 2018; 16:25	Japan	19–19	Iran	Al-Saada Indoor Hall, Salalah; Referees: Hussein, Imran (IRQ)
20 July 2018; 16:25	Sakurai, Tokuda 5	(9–5)	Behnamnia 6	Al-Saada Indoor Hall, Salalah; Referees: Hussein, Imran (IRQ)
20 July 2018; 16:25	2× (yellow card) 5× (suspension)		1× (yellow card) 5× (suspension)	Al-Saada Indoor Hall, Salalah; Referees: Hussein, Imran (IRQ)

21 July 2018; 14:30	Qatar	26–26	Iran	Al-Saada Indoor Hall, Salalah; Referees: Covalciuc, Covalciuc (MDA)
21 July 2018; 14:30	Gačević 8	(11–11)	Taheri 6	Al-Saada Indoor Hall, Salalah; Referees: Covalciuc, Covalciuc (MDA)
21 July 2018; 14:30	3× (yellow card) 4× (suspension) 1×		4× (yellow card) 2× (suspension)	Al-Saada Indoor Hall, Salalah; Referees: Covalciuc, Covalciuc (MDA)

21 July 2018; 16:15	Japan	26–23	Saudi Arabia	Al-Saada Indoor Hall, Salalah
21 July 2018; 16:15	Takano 8	(16–9)	Al-Sadah 6	Al-Saada Indoor Hall, Salalah
21 July 2018; 16:15	3× (yellow card) 1× (suspension)		1× (yellow card) 3× (suspension)	Al-Saada Indoor Hall, Salalah

22 July 2018; 14:15	Iran	24–30	Saudi Arabia	Al-Saada Indoor Hall, Salalah; Referees: Covalciuc, Covalciuc (MDA)
22 July 2018; 14:15	Behnamnia 5	(12–15)	Al-Madan 11	Al-Saada Indoor Hall, Salalah; Referees: Covalciuc, Covalciuc (MDA)
22 July 2018; 14:15	3× (yellow card) 2× (suspension)		3× (yellow card) 2× (suspension)	Al-Saada Indoor Hall, Salalah; Referees: Covalciuc, Covalciuc (MDA)

22 July 2018; 16:00	Qatar	17–23	Japan	Al-Saada Indoor Hall, Salalah; Referees: Al-Zayyat, Awwad (JOR)
22 July 2018; 16:00	Mohamed 6	(10–12)	Kawasaki, Tokuda 4	Al-Saada Indoor Hall, Salalah; Referees: Al-Zayyat, Awwad (JOR)
22 July 2018; 16:00	3× (yellow card) 2× (suspension)		1× (yellow card) 3× (suspension)	Al-Saada Indoor Hall, Salalah; Referees: Al-Zayyat, Awwad (JOR)

== Knockout stage ==
=== Bracket ===
Semifinals
24 July
South Korea	24
Saudi Arabia	19
24 July
Japan	20
Bahrain	17

Final
26 July
South Korea (OT)	27
Japan	25
Third place
26 July
Saudi Arabia	28
Bahrain	29

=== Seventh place game ===
24 July 2018
14:15
Oman
23–25
Qatar
Al-Saada Indoor Hall, Salalah
Referees: Tavakoli, Valadkhanian (IRI)

(9–10)

3× (yellow card) 1× (suspension)

3× (yellow card) 3× (suspension)

FT: 20–20 Pen: 3–5

=== Fifth place game ===
24 July 2018; 16:00	Iran	29–23	Iraq	Al-Saada Indoor Hall, Salalah; Referees: Koo, Lee (KOR)
24 July 2018; 16:00		(14–12)		Al-Saada Indoor Hall, Salalah; Referees: Koo, Lee (KOR)
24 July 2018; 16:00	3× (yellow card) 2× (suspension)		3× (yellow card) 2× (suspension)	Al-Saada Indoor Hall, Salalah; Referees: Koo, Lee (KOR)

=== Semifinals ===
24 July 2018; 17:45	South Korea	24–19	Saudi Arabia	Al-Saada Indoor Hall, Salalah; Referees: Covalciuc, Covalciuc (MDA)
24 July 2018; 17:45	Kim R. 8	(9–12)	Al-Madan 6	Al-Saada Indoor Hall, Salalah; Referees: Covalciuc, Covalciuc (MDA)
24 July 2018; 17:45	4× (yellow card) 4× (suspension)		4× (yellow card) 5× (suspension)	Al-Saada Indoor Hall, Salalah; Referees: Covalciuc, Covalciuc (MDA)

24 July 2018; 19:30	Japan	20–17	Bahrain	Al-Saada Indoor Hall, Salalah; Referees: Hussein, Imran (IRQ)
24 July 2018; 19:30	Tokuda 8	(13–9)	Al-Zaimoor 8	Al-Saada Indoor Hall, Salalah; Referees: Hussein, Imran (IRQ)
24 July 2018; 19:30	2× (yellow card) 5× (suspension)		3× (yellow card) 7× (suspension)	Al-Saada Indoor Hall, Salalah; Referees: Hussein, Imran (IRQ)

=== Third place game ===
26 July 2018; 16:15	Saudi Arabia	28–29	Bahrain	Al-Saada Indoor Hall, Salalah; Referees: Koo, Lee (KOR)
26 July 2018; 16:15	Al-Madan 6	(11–16)	Al-Zaimoor 10	Al-Saada Indoor Hall, Salalah; Referees: Koo, Lee (KOR)
26 July 2018; 16:15	3× (yellow card)		2× (yellow card) 2× (suspension)	Al-Saada Indoor Hall, Salalah; Referees: Koo, Lee (KOR)

=== Final ===
26 July 2018
18:15
South Korea
27–25 (ET)
Japan
Al-Saada Indoor Hall, Salalah
Referees: Al-Zayyat, Awwad (JOR)
Kang 9
(12–9)
Tokuda 8
2× (yellow card) 3× (suspension)

2× (yellow card) 3× (suspension)

FT: 22–22 ET: 5–3

== Final standings ==
Rank	Team
1st place, gold medalist(s)	South Korea
2nd place, silver medalist(s)	Japan
3rd place, bronze medalist(s)	Bahrain
4	Saudi Arabia
5	Iran
6	Iraq
7	Qatar
8	Oman
9	China
10	Chinese Taipei
11	India
12	Lebanon
13	Syria
14	Yemen

Team qualified for the 2019 Junior World Championship

== All-Star Team ==
Position	Player
Goalkeeper	Hassan Al-Turaik (KSA)
Right wing	Kim Jin-young (KOR)
Right back	Rennosuke Tokuda (JPN)
Centre back	Kang Tan (KOR)
Left back	Abdulla Al-Zaimoor (BHR)
Left wing	Jeon Young-je (KOR)
Pivot	Sota Takano (JPN)
