= 2024 Asian Men's Junior Handball Championship =

Tournament details
- Host country: Jordan
- Venue(s): 1 (in 1 host city)
- Dates: 14–25 July
- Teams: 13 (from 1 confederation)

Final positions
- Champions: Japan (2nd title)
- Runner-up: South Korea
- Third place: Bahrain
- Fourth place: Saudi Arabia

Tournament statistics
- Matches played: 43
- Goals scored: 2,631 (61.19 per match)

The 2024 Asian Men's Junior Handball Championship was the 18th edition of the championship held from 14 to 25 July 2024 in Amman, Jordan under the aegis of Asian Handball Federation. It was the third time in history that the championship will be organised by the Jordan Handball Federation. It also acted as the qualification tournament for the 2025 Men's Junior World Handball Championship. Top four teams from the championship directly qualified for the Junior World Championship to be held in Poland.

== Draw ==
The draw was held on 4 May 2024 at 16:00 at the headquarters of the Jordan Handball Federation in Amman, Jordan.

=== Seeding ===
Teams were seeded according to the AHF COC regulations and rankings of the previous edition of the championship. Teams who had not participate in the previous edition were in Pot 3.

Pot 1	Pot 2	Pot 3
Bahrain; Japan; Jordan (host); Kuwait	India; Iran; Saudi Arabia; South Korea	China; Hong Kong; India; Oman; Qatar

== Preliminary round ==
All times are local (UTC+3).

=== Group A ===
Pos	Team	Pld	W	D	L	GF	GA	GD	Pts	Qualification
1	Bahrain	2	2	0	0	67	38	+29	4	Main round
2	Saudi Arabia	2	1	0	1	70	45	+25	2	Main round
3	Hong Kong	2	0	0	2	32	86	−54	0	Martyr Fahad Al-Ahmad Al-Sabah Cup

Source: AHF
Rules for classification: 1) Points; 2) Head-to-head points; 3) Head-to-head goal difference; 4) Head-to-head goals scored; 5) Goal difference; 6) Goals scored; 7) Draw.

14 July 2024; 15:30	Hong Kong	13–41	Bahrain	Princess Sumaya Hall, Amman
14 July 2024; 15:30		(10–21)		Princess Sumaya Hall, Amman
14 July 2024; 15:30		Report		Princess Sumaya Hall, Amman

15 July 2024; 12:00	Saudi Arabia	45–19	Hong Kong	Princess Sumaya Hall, Amman
15 July 2024; 12:00		(23–7)		Princess Sumaya Hall, Amman
15 July 2024; 12:00		Report		Princess Sumaya Hall, Amman

16 July 2024; 13:45	Bahrain	26–25	Saudi Arabia	Princess Sumaya Hall, Amman
16 July 2024; 13:45		(18–12)		Princess Sumaya Hall, Amman
16 July 2024; 13:45		Report		Princess Sumaya Hall, Amman

=== Group B ===
Pos	Team	Pld	W	D	L	GF	GA	GD	Pts	Qualification
1	Iran	2	2	0	0	55	49	+6	4	Main round
2	Kuwait	2	1	0	1	51	49	+2	2	Main round
3	China	2	0	0	2	50	58	−8	0	Martyr Fahad Al-Ahmad Al-Sabah Cup

Source: AHF
Rules for classification: 1) Points; 2) Head-to-head points; 3) Head-to-head goal difference; 4) Head-to-head goals scored; 5) Goal difference; 6) Goals scored; 7) Draw.

14 July 2024; 17:15	China	24–28	Kuwait	Princess Sumaya Hall, Amman
14 July 2024; 17:15		(15–13)		Princess Sumaya Hall, Amman
14 July 2024; 17:15		Report		Princess Sumaya Hall, Amman

15 July 2024; 13:45	Iran	30–26	China	Princess Sumaya Hall, Amman
15 July 2024; 13:45		(17–9)		Princess Sumaya Hall, Amman
15 July 2024; 13:45		Report		Princess Sumaya Hall, Amman

16 July 2024; 12:00	Kuwait	23–25	Iran	Princess Sumaya Hall, Amman
16 July 2024; 12:00		(11–12)		Princess Sumaya Hall, Amman
16 July 2024; 12:00		Report		Princess Sumaya Hall, Amman

=== Group C ===
Pos	Team	Pld	W	D	L	GF	GA	GD	Pts	Qualification
1	Jordan (H)	2	2	0	0	93	53	+40	4	Main round
2	Oman	2	1	0	1	62	55	+7	2	Main round
3	India	2	0	0	2	56	103	−47	0	Martyr Fahad Al-Ahmad Al-Sabah Cup

Source: AHF
Rules for classification: 1) Points; 2) Head-to-head points; 3) Head-to-head goal difference; 4) Head-to-head goals scored; 5) Goal difference; 6) Goals scored; 7) Draw.
(H) Hosts

14 July 2024; 19:00	India	25–40	Oman	Princess Sumaya Hall, Amman
14 July 2024; 19:00		(11–18)		Princess Sumaya Hall, Amman
14 July 2024; 19:00		Report		Princess Sumaya Hall, Amman

15 July 2024; 19:00	Oman	22–30	Jordan	Princess Sumaya Hall, Amman
15 July 2024; 19:00		(11–15)		Princess Sumaya Hall, Amman
15 July 2024; 19:00		Report		Princess Sumaya Hall, Amman

16 July 2024; 17:15	Jordan	63–31	India	Princess Sumaya Hall, Amman
16 July 2024; 17:15		(31–18)		Princess Sumaya Hall, Amman
16 July 2024; 17:15		Report		Princess Sumaya Hall, Amman

=== Group D ===
Pos	Team	Pld	W	D	L	GF	GA	GD	Pts	Qualification
1	Japan	3	2	1	0	96	82	+14	5	Main round
2	South Korea	3	2	0	1	104	85	+19	4	Main round
3	Qatar	3	1	1	1	78	84	−6	3	Martyr Fahad Al-Ahmad Al-Sabah Cup
4	Chinese Taipei	3	0	0	3	80	107	−27	0	Martyr Fahad Al-Ahmad Al-Sabah Cup

Source: AHF
Rules for classification: 1) Points; 2) Head-to-head points; 3) Head-to-head goal difference; 4) Head-to-head goals scored; 5) Goal difference; 6) Goals scored; 7) Draw.

14 July 2024; 12:00	Chinese Taipei	25–43	South Korea	Princess Sumaya Hall, Amman
14 July 2024; 12:00		(11–20)		Princess Sumaya Hall, Amman
14 July 2024; 12:00		Report		Princess Sumaya Hall, Amman

14 July 2024; 13:45	Qatar	25–25	Japan	Princess Sumaya Hall, Amman
14 July 2024; 13:45		(12–14)		Princess Sumaya Hall, Amman
14 July 2024; 13:45		Report		Princess Sumaya Hall, Amman

15 July 2024; 15:30	Qatar	24–33	South Korea	Princess Sumaya Hall, Amman
15 July 2024; 15:30		(11–16)		Princess Sumaya Hall, Amman
15 July 2024; 15:30		Report		Princess Sumaya Hall, Amman

15 July 2024; 17:15	Chinese Taipei	29–35	Japan	Princess Sumaya Hall, Amman
15 July 2024; 17:15		(14–16)		Princess Sumaya Hall, Amman
15 July 2024; 17:15		Report		Princess Sumaya Hall, Amman

16 July 2024; 15:30	Chinese Taipei	26–29	Qatar	Princess Sumaya Hall, Amman
16 July 2024; 15:30		(13–12)		Princess Sumaya Hall, Amman
16 July 2024; 15:30		Report		Princess Sumaya Hall, Amman

16 July 2024; 19:00	Japan	36–28	South Korea	Princess Sumaya Hall, Amman
16 July 2024; 19:00		(17–14)		Princess Sumaya Hall, Amman
16 July 2024; 19:00		Report		Princess Sumaya Hall, Amman

== Martyr Fahad Al-Ahmad Al-Sabah Cup ==
=== Group III ===
Pos	Team	Pld	W	D	L	GF	GA	GD	Pts
9	China	4	4	0	0	172	109	+63	8
10	Chinese Taipei	4	3	0	1	183	117	+66	6
11	Qatar	4	2	0	2	161	130	+31	4
12	India	4	1	0	3	148	233	−85	2
13	Hong Kong	4	0	0	4	100	175	−75	0

Source: AHF
Rules for classification: 1) Points; 2) Head-to-head points; 3) Head-to-head goal difference; 4) Head-to-head goals scored; 5) Goal difference; 6) Goals scored; 7) Draw.

18 July 2024; 11:00	Qatar	31–36	China	Princess Sumaya Hall, Amman
18 July 2024; 11:00		(16–20)		Princess Sumaya Hall, Amman
18 July 2024; 11:00		Report		Princess Sumaya Hall, Amman

18 July 2024; 12:45	Chinese Taipei	41–20	Hong Kong	Princess Sumaya Hall, Amman
18 July 2024; 12:45		(21–10)		Princess Sumaya Hall, Amman
18 July 2024; 12:45		Report		Princess Sumaya Hall, Amman

19 July 2024; 13:00	India	33–64	China	Princess Sumaya Hall, Amman
19 July 2024; 13:00		(20–32)		Princess Sumaya Hall, Amman
19 July 2024; 13:00		Report		Princess Sumaya Hall, Amman

19 July 2024; 15:00	Qatar	46–19	Hong Kong	Princess Sumaya Hall, Amman
19 July 2024; 15:00		(22–10)		Princess Sumaya Hall, Amman
19 July 2024; 15:00		Report		Princess Sumaya Hall, Amman

20 July 2024; 13:00	India	36–50	Qatar	Princess Sumaya Hall, Amman
20 July 2024; 13:00		(12–21)		Princess Sumaya Hall, Amman
20 July 2024; 13:00		Report		Princess Sumaya Hall, Amman

20 July 2024; 15:00	China	30–29	Chinese Taipei	Princess Sumaya Hall, Amman
20 July 2024; 15:00		(14–14)		Princess Sumaya Hall, Amman
20 July 2024; 15:00		Report		Princess Sumaya Hall, Amman

23 July 2024; 13:00	Chinese Taipei	39–34	Qatar	Princess Sumaya Hall, Amman
23 July 2024; 13:00		(16–18)		Princess Sumaya Hall, Amman
23 July 2024; 13:00		Report		Princess Sumaya Hall, Amman

23 July 2024; 15:00	India	46–45	Hong Kong	Princess Sumaya Hall, Amman
23 July 2024; 15:00		(24–20)		Princess Sumaya Hall, Amman
23 July 2024; 15:00		Report		Princess Sumaya Hall, Amman

24 July 2024; 13:00	Chinese Taipei	74–33	India	Princess Sumaya Hall, Amman
24 July 2024; 13:00		(28–15)		Princess Sumaya Hall, Amman
24 July 2024; 13:00		Report		Princess Sumaya Hall, Amman

24 July 2024; 15:00	Hong Kong	16–42	China	Princess Sumaya Hall, Amman
24 July 2024; 15:00		(7–20)		Princess Sumaya Hall, Amman
24 July 2024; 15:00		Report		Princess Sumaya Hall, Amman

== Main round ==
=== Group I ===
Pos	Team	Pld	W	D	L	GF	GA	GD	Pts	Qualification
1	South Korea	3	2	1	0	87	68	+19	5	Semifinals
2	Bahrain	3	2	1	0	73	65	+8	5	Semifinals
3	Kuwait	3	1	0	2	67	69	−2	2	Fifth place game
4	Jordan (H)	3	0	0	3	71	96	−25	0	Seventh place game

Source: AHF
Rules for classification: 1) Points; 2) Head-to-head points; 3) Head-to-head goal difference; 4) Head-to-head goals scored; 5) Goal difference; 6) Goals scored; 7) Draw.
(H) Hosts

18 July 2024; 16:15	South Korea	25–25	Bahrain	Princess Sumaya Hall, Amman
18 July 2024; 16:15		(9–11)		Princess Sumaya Hall, Amman
18 July 2024; 16:15		Report		Princess Sumaya Hall, Amman

18 July 2024; 19:45	Jordan	26–29	Kuwait	Princess Sumaya Hall, Amman
18 July 2024; 19:45		(11–15)		Princess Sumaya Hall, Amman
18 July 2024; 19:45		Report		Princess Sumaya Hall, Amman

19 July 2024; 17:00	South Korea	37–19	Jordan	Princess Sumaya Hall, Amman
19 July 2024; 17:00		(16–7)		Princess Sumaya Hall, Amman
19 July 2024; 17:00		Report		Princess Sumaya Hall, Amman

20 July 2024; 19:00	Bahrain	18–14	Kuwait	Princess Sumaya Hall, Amman
20 July 2024; 19:00		(7–6)		Princess Sumaya Hall, Amman
20 July 2024; 19:00		Report		Princess Sumaya Hall, Amman

21 July 2024; 15:00	Kuwait	24–25	South Korea	Princess Sumaya Hall, Amman
21 July 2024; 15:00		(14–12)		Princess Sumaya Hall, Amman
21 July 2024; 15:00		Report		Princess Sumaya Hall, Amman

21 July 2024; 19:00	Bahrain	30–26	Jordan	Princess Sumaya Hall, Amman
21 July 2024; 19:00		(18–13)		Princess Sumaya Hall, Amman
21 July 2024; 19:00		Report		Princess Sumaya Hall, Amman

=== Group II ===
Pos	Team	Pld	W	D	L	GF	GA	GD	Pts	Qualification
1	Japan	3	3	0	0	103	79	+24	6	Semifinals
2	Saudi Arabia	3	2	0	1	94	80	+14	4	Semifinals
3	Iran	3	1	0	2	86	76	+10	2	Fifth place game
4	Oman	3	0	0	3	61	109	−48	0	Seventh place game

Source: AHF
Rules for classification: 1) Points; 2) Head-to-head points; 3) Head-to-head goal difference; 4) Head-to-head goals scored; 5) Goal difference; 6) Goals scored; 7) Draw.

18 July 2024; 14:30	Japan	32–31	Saudi Arabia	Princess Sumaya Hall, Amman
18 July 2024; 14:30		(16–17)		Princess Sumaya Hall, Amman
18 July 2024; 14:30		Report		Princess Sumaya Hall, Amman

18 July 2024; 18:00	Oman	19–32	Iran	Princess Sumaya Hall, Amman
18 July 2024; 18:00		(9–19)		Princess Sumaya Hall, Amman
18 July 2024; 18:00		Report		Princess Sumaya Hall, Amman

19 July 2024; 19:00	Saudi Arabia	26–25	Iran	Princess Sumaya Hall, Amman
19 July 2024; 19:00		(14–13)		Princess Sumaya Hall, Amman
19 July 2024; 19:00		Report		Princess Sumaya Hall, Amman

20 July 2024; 17:00	Japan	40–19	Oman	Princess Sumaya Hall, Amman
20 July 2024; 17:00		(16–8)		Princess Sumaya Hall, Amman
20 July 2024; 17:00		Report		Princess Sumaya Hall, Amman

21 July 2024; 13:00	Saudi Arabia	37–23	Oman	Princess Sumaya Hall, Amman
21 July 2024; 13:00		(21–9)		Princess Sumaya Hall, Amman
21 July 2024; 13:00		Report		Princess Sumaya Hall, Amman

21 July 2024; 17:00	Iran	29–31	Japan	Princess Sumaya Hall, Amman
21 July 2024; 17:00		(18–16)		Princess Sumaya Hall, Amman
21 July 2024; 17:00		Report		Princess Sumaya Hall, Amman

== Knockout stage ==
=== Bracket ===
Semifinals
23 July
South Korea	30
Saudi Arabia	21
23 July
Japan	30
Bahrain	26

Final
25 July
South Korea	27
Japan	32
Third place
25 July
Saudi Arabia	25
Bahrain	28

=== Seventh place game ===
24 July 2024; 17:00	Jordan	30–25	Oman	Princess Sumaya Hall, Amman
24 July 2024; 17:00		(12–7)		Princess Sumaya Hall, Amman
24 July 2024; 17:00		Report		Princess Sumaya Hall, Amman

=== Fifth place game ===
24 July 2024; 19:00	Kuwait	28–29	Iran	Princess Sumaya Hall, Amman
24 July 2024; 19:00		(17–17)		Princess Sumaya Hall, Amman
24 July 2024; 19:00		Report		Princess Sumaya Hall, Amman

=== Semifinals ===
23 July 2024; 17:00	South Korea	30–21	Saudi Arabia	Princess Sumaya Hall, Amman
23 July 2024; 17:00		(10–10)		Princess Sumaya Hall, Amman
23 July 2024; 17:00		Report		Princess Sumaya Hall, Amman

23 July 2024; 19:00	Japan	30–26	Bahrain	Princess Sumaya Hall, Amman
23 July 2024; 19:00		(18–15)		Princess Sumaya Hall, Amman
23 July 2024; 19:00		Report		Princess Sumaya Hall, Amman

=== Third place game ===
25 July 2024; 16:00	Saudi Arabia	25–28	Bahrain	Princess Sumaya Hall, Amman; Referees: Gheisarian, Gheisarian (IRI)
25 July 2024; 16:00	Al-Obaidi, Al-Turaiki 7	(14–13)	Mahdi 8	Princess Sumaya Hall, Amman; Referees: Gheisarian, Gheisarian (IRI)
25 July 2024; 16:00	1× (yellow card) 1× (suspension) 1× (red card)	Report	2× (suspension)	Princess Sumaya Hall, Amman; Referees: Gheisarian, Gheisarian (IRI)

=== Final ===
25 July 2024; 18:00	South Korea	27–32	Japan	Princess Sumaya Hall, Amman; Referees: Ismoilov, Ismoilov (UZB)
25 July 2024; 18:00	Lee M. 10	(14–14)	Nagamori 12	Princess Sumaya Hall, Amman; Referees: Ismoilov, Ismoilov (UZB)
25 July 2024; 18:00	1× (suspension)	Report	1× (suspension)	Princess Sumaya Hall, Amman; Referees: Ismoilov, Ismoilov (UZB)

== Final standings ==
Rank	Team
1st place, gold medalist(s)	Japan
2nd place, silver medalist(s)	South Korea
3rd place, bronze medalist(s)	Bahrain
4	Saudi Arabia
5	Iran
6	Kuwait
7	Jordan
8	Oman
9	China
10	Chinese Taipei
11	Qatar
12	India
13	Hong Kong

Team qualified for the 2025 Junior World Championship

== All Star Team ==
Position	Player
Most valuable player	(Japan) Haruki Kawada
Goalkeeper	(South Korea) Kim Hyeon-min
Right wing	(Japan) Soi Hasegawa
Right back	(South Korea) Lee Min-jun
Centre back	(Saudi Arabia) Ahmed Al-Obaidi
Left back	(Bahrain) Jaffar Farsan
Left wing	(Japan) Kotaro Tachibana
Pivot	(Bahrain) Sayed Al-Falahi
