= 2016 Asian Men's Junior Handball Championship =

2016 handball championship in Asia

- Logo of 15th Asian Men's Junior Handball Championship

Tournament details
- Host country: Jordan
- Venue(s): 1 (in 1 host city)
- Dates: 22 July – 1 August 2016
- Teams: 12 (from 1 confederation)

Final positions
- Champions: Qatar (5th title)
- Runner-up: Saudi Arabia
- Third place: South Korea
- Fourth place: Japan

Tournament statistics
- Matches played: 36
- Goals scored: 2,109 (58.58 per match)

The 2016 Asian Men's Junior Handball Championship is the 15th edition of the Asian Men's Junior Handball Championship held from 22 July to 1 August 2016 at Amman, Jordan under the aegis of Asian Handball Federation. It also acts as the qualification tournament for the 2017 Men's Junior World Handball Championship.

== Draw ==
Group A	Group B	Group C	Group D
Iran	Japan	South Korea	Qatar
Uzbekistan	Saudi Arabia	Bahrain	Iraq
Jordan	Palestine	India	China
			~~United Arab Emirates~~

United Arab Emirates withdrew from the tournament after the draw took place.

== Preliminary round ==
=== Group A ===
Team	Pld	W	D	L	GF	GA	GD	Pts
Iran	2	2	0	0	78	39	+39	4
Jordan	2	1	0	1	46	68	−22	2
Uzbekistan	2	0	0	2	49	66	−17	0

22 July 2016; 18:00	Jordan	17–41	Iran	Amman, Jordan
22 July 2016; 18:00		(9–20)		Amman, Jordan

23 July 2016; 20:00	Uzbekistan	27–29	Jordan	Amman, Jordan
23 July 2016; 20:00		(12–17)		Amman, Jordan

24 July 2016; 14:00	Iran	37–22	Uzbekistan	Amman, Jordan
24 July 2016; 14:00		(19–5)		Amman, Jordan

=== Group B ===
Team	Pld	W	D	L	GF	GA	GD	Pts
Saudi Arabia	2	2	0	0	75	38	+37	4
Japan	2	1	0	1	72	41	+31	2
Palestine	2	0	0	2	30	98	−68	0

22 July 2016; 16:00	Palestine	15–49	Japan	Amman, Jordan
22 July 2016; 16:00		(10–23)		Amman, Jordan

23 July 2016; 14:00	Saudi Arabia	49–15	Palestine	Amman, Jordan
23 July 2016; 14:00		(22–9)		Amman, Jordan

24 July 2016; 20:00	Japan	23–26	Saudi Arabia	Amman, Jordan
24 July 2016; 20:00		(13–10)		Amman, Jordan

=== Group C ===
Team	Pld	W	D	L	GF	GA	GD	Pts
South Korea	2	2	0	0	93	49	+44	4
Bahrain	2	1	0	1	112	59	+53	2
India	2	0	0	2	54	151	−97	0

22 July 2016; 20:00	India	23–65	South Korea	Amman, Jordan
22 July 2016; 20:00		(13–28)		Amman, Jordan

23 July 2016; 18:00	Bahrain	86–31	India	Amman, Jordan
23 July 2016; 18:00		(42–13)		Amman, Jordan

24 July 2016; 16:00	South Korea	28–26	Bahrain	Amman, Jordan
24 July 2016; 16:00		(13–11)		Amman, Jordan

=== Group D ===
Team	Pld	W	D	L	GF	GA	GD	Pts
Qatar	2	2	0	0	59	35	+24	4
Iraq	2	1	0	1	48	45	+3	2
China	2	0	0	2	42	69	−27	0

22 July 2016; 14:00	China	20–36	Qatar	Amman, Jordan
22 July 2016; 14:00		(10–16)		Amman, Jordan

23 July 2016; 16:00	China	22–33	Iraq	Amman, Jordan
23 July 2016; 16:00		(11–12)		Amman, Jordan

24 July 2016; 18:00	Qatar	23–15	Iraq	Amman, Jordan
24 July 2016; 18:00		(10–6)		Amman, Jordan

== Placement Round ==
Team were seeded according to their results in preliminary groups.

Team	Pld	W	D	L	GF	GA	GD	Pts
China	3	3	0	0	100	80	+20	6
Uzbekistan	3	2	0	1	112	85	+27	4
India	3	1	0	2	114	118	−4	2
Palestine	3	0	0	3	79	122	−43	0

26 July 2016; 12:00	China	35–21	Palestine	Amman, Jordan
26 July 2016; 12:00		(16–11)		Amman, Jordan

27 July 2016; 10:00	India	48–35	Palestine	Amman, Jordan
27 July 2016; 10:00		(26–20)		Amman, Jordan

27 July 2016; 12:00	China	28–27	Uzbekistan	Amman, Jordan
27 July 2016; 12:00		(15–15)		Amman, Jordan

29 July 2016; 12:00	India	32–37	China	Amman, Jordan
29 July 2016; 12:00		(14–17)		Amman, Jordan

30 July 2016; 12:00	India	34–46	Uzbekistan	Amman, Jordan
30 July 2016; 12:00		(18–23)		Amman, Jordan

31 July 2016; 11:00	Uzbekistan	39–23	Palestine	Amman, Jordan
31 July 2016; 11:00		(19–12)		Amman, Jordan

== Main Round ==
Team were seeded according to their result of preliminary group matches.

=== Group I ===
Team	Pld	W	D	L	GF	GA	GD	Pts
South Korea	3	3	0	0	88	76	+12	6
Japan	3	1	1	1	87	85	+2	3
Iraq	3	1	0	2	80	87	−7	2
Iran	3	0	1	2	86	93	−7	1

26 July 2016; 16:00	Iraq	34–29	Iran	Amman, Jordan
26 July 2016; 16:00		(9–10)		Amman, Jordan

26 July 2016; 20:00	South Korea	31–27	Japan	Amman, Jordan
26 July 2016; 20:00		(12–10)		Amman, Jordan

27 July 2016; 16:00	Japan	30–24	Iraq	Amman, Jordan
27 July 2016; 16:00		(15–11)		Amman, Jordan

27 July 2016; 20:00	Iran	27–29	South Korea	Amman, Jordan
27 July 2016; 20:00		(11–15)		Amman, Jordan

29 July 2016; 16:00	Iraq	22–28	South Korea	Amman, Jordan
29 July 2016; 16:00		(9–18)		Amman, Jordan

29 July 2016; 20:00	Iran	30–30	Japan	Amman, Jordan
29 July 2016; 20:00		(10–16)		Amman, Jordan

=== Group II ===
Team	Pld	W	D	L	GF	GA	GD	Pts
Qatar	3	3	0	0	77	58	+19	6
Saudi Arabia	3	2	0	1	74	59	+15	4
Bahrain	3	1	0	2	94	71	+23	2
Jordan	3	0	0	3	49	106	−57	0

26 July 2016; 14:00	Qatar	31–15	Jordan	Amman, Jordan
26 July 2016; 14:00		(14–7)		Amman, Jordan

26 July 2016; 18:00	Bahrain	23–27	Saudi Arabia	Amman, Jordan
26 July 2016; 18:00		(9–12)		Amman, Jordan

27 July 2016; 14:00	Jordan	19–48	Bahrain	Amman, Jordan
27 July 2016; 14:00		(5–24)		Amman, Jordan

27 July 2016; 18:00	Saudi Arabia	20–21	Qatar	Amman, Jordan
27 July 2016; 18:00		(12–11)		Amman, Jordan

29 July 2016; 14:00	Qatar	25–23	Bahrain	Amman, Jordan
29 July 2016; 14:00		(14–9)		Amman, Jordan

29 July 2016; 18:00	Jordan	15–27	Saudi Arabia	Amman, Jordan
29 July 2016; 18:00		(10–14)		Amman, Jordan

== Knockout stage ==
=== Seventh place game ===
30 July 2016; 14:00	Iran	33–13	Jordan	Amman, Jordan
30 July 2016; 14:00		(16–8)		Amman, Jordan

=== Fifth place game ===
30 July 2016; 16:00	Iraq	27–26	Bahrain	Amman, Jordan
30 July 2016; 16:00		(13–16)		Amman, Jordan

=== Semifinals ===
30 July 2016; 18:00	South Korea	28–29	Saudi Arabia	Amman, Jordan
30 July 2016; 18:00		(13–15)		Amman, Jordan

30 July 2016; 20:00	Qatar	29–25	Japan	Amman, Jordan
30 July 2016; 20:00		(15–13)		Amman, Jordan

=== Third place game ===
1 August 2016; 16:00	South Korea	33–29	Japan	Amman, Jordan
1 August 2016; 16:00		(15–14)		Amman, Jordan

=== Final ===
1 August 2016; 18:00	Saudi Arabia	16–23	Qatar	Amman, Jordan
1 August 2016; 18:00		(7–11)		Amman, Jordan

== Final standings ==
Rank	Team
1st place, gold medalist(s)	Qatar
2nd place, silver medalist(s)	Saudi Arabia
3rd place, bronze medalist(s)	South Korea
4	Japan
5	Iraq
6	Bahrain
7	Iran
8	Jordan
9	China
10	Uzbekistan
11	India
12	Palestine

Team qualified for the 2017 Junior World Championship
