= 2026 Asian Men's Junior Handball Championship =

Tournament details
- Host country: China
- Venue: 1 (in 1 host city)
- Dates: 15–27 July
- Teams: 13 (from 1 confederation)

Final positions
- Champions: South Korea (4th title)
- Runners-up: United Arab Emirates
- Third place: Saudi Arabia
- Fourth place: Bahrain

Tournament statistics
- Matches played: 50
- Goals scored: 2,997 (59.94 per match)
- Top scorers: (Kuwait) Yosef Madwah (68 goals)

Awards
- Best player: (United Arab Emirates) Eyad Toukhy

The 2026 Asian Men's Junior Handball Championship was the 19th edition of the championship, held from 15 to 27 July 2026 in Chuzhou, Anhui, China, under the auspices of the Asian Handball Federation (AHF). Thirteen national teams took part, and the Chinese Handball Association hosted the championship for the second time.

The tournament served as the Asian qualification competition for the 2027 Men's Junior World Handball Championship, scheduled to be held in North Macedonia from 23 June to 4 July 2027. The four semifinalists—South Korea, the United Arab Emirates, Saudi Arabia and Bahrain—secured places at the world championship.

South Korea won its fourth title and its first since 2018 by defeating the United Arab Emirates 25–24 in the final. The United Arab Emirates finished as runners-up for the first time, while Saudi Arabia defeated Bahrain 37–27 in the third-place match.

== Venue ==
City	Venue
Chuzhou, Anhui	Chuzhou International Handball Hall

== Draw ==
The draw was held on 13 May 2026 at 11:00 at the Hotel Royal Tulip in Almaty, Kazakhstan. The teams were divided into Group A (six teams) and Group B (seven teams).

Group A	Group B
China; Bahrain; Saudi Arabia; Oman; Chinese Taipei; Hong Kong	Japan; South Korea; Iran; Kuwait; Qatar; India; United Arab Emirates

== Preliminary round ==
The preliminary round was played in a single round-robin format from 15 to 22 July 2026. The four highest-placed teams in each group qualified for the quarterfinals on 24 July. All match times are local (China Standard Time, UTC+8). The standings, scores and match details are published by the AHF and the Japan Handball Association.

=== Group A ===
Pos	Team	Pld	W	D	L	GF	GA	GD	Pts	Qualification
1	Saudi Arabia	5	5	0	0	197	123	+74	10	Quarterfinals
2	Bahrain	5	4	0	1	176	122	+54	8	Quarterfinals
3	China	5	3	0	2	152	137	+15	6	Quarterfinals
4	Chinese Taipei	5	2	0	3	164	163	+1	4	Quarterfinals
5	Oman	5	1	0	4	127	166	−39	2	Ninth place game
6	Hong Kong	5	0	0	5	75	180	−105	0	Eleventh place game

Source: AHF

15 July 2026; 12:00	Saudi Arabia	40–27	Oman	Chuzhou International Handball Hall, Chuzhou
15 July 2026; 12:00		(23–9)		Chuzhou International Handball Hall, Chuzhou
15 July 2026; 12:00		Report		Chuzhou International Handball Hall, Chuzhou

15 July 2026; 16:00	Bahrain	39–27	Chinese Taipei	Chuzhou International Handball Hall, Chuzhou
15 July 2026; 16:00		(17–11)		Chuzhou International Handball Hall, Chuzhou
15 July 2026; 16:00		Report		Chuzhou International Handball Hall, Chuzhou

15 July 2026; 20:30	China	28–12	Hong Kong	Chuzhou International Handball Hall, Chuzhou
15 July 2026; 20:30		(14–6)		Chuzhou International Handball Hall, Chuzhou
15 July 2026; 20:30		Report		Chuzhou International Handball Hall, Chuzhou

16 July 2026; 12:00	Bahrain	26–30	Saudi Arabia	Chuzhou International Handball Hall, Chuzhou
16 July 2026; 12:00		(12–17)		Chuzhou International Handball Hall, Chuzhou
16 July 2026; 12:00		Report		Chuzhou International Handball Hall, Chuzhou

16 July 2026; 16:00	Chinese Taipei	29–36	China	Chuzhou International Handball Hall, Chuzhou
16 July 2026; 16:00		(13–17)		Chuzhou International Handball Hall, Chuzhou
16 July 2026; 16:00		Report		Chuzhou International Handball Hall, Chuzhou

16 July 2026; 20:00	Oman	25–21	Hong Kong	Chuzhou International Handball Hall, Chuzhou
16 July 2026; 20:00		(10–12)		Chuzhou International Handball Hall, Chuzhou
16 July 2026; 20:00		Report		Chuzhou International Handball Hall, Chuzhou

19 July 2026; 10:00	China	31–26	Oman	Chuzhou International Handball Hall, Chuzhou
19 July 2026; 10:00		(15–14)		Chuzhou International Handball Hall, Chuzhou
19 July 2026; 10:00		Report		Chuzhou International Handball Hall, Chuzhou

19 July 2026; 14:00	Hong Kong	15–43	Bahrain	Chuzhou International Handball Hall, Chuzhou
19 July 2026; 14:00		(7–24)		Chuzhou International Handball Hall, Chuzhou
19 July 2026; 14:00		Report		Chuzhou International Handball Hall, Chuzhou

19 July 2026; 18:00	Saudi Arabia	46–29	Chinese Taipei	Chuzhou International Handball Hall, Chuzhou
19 July 2026; 18:00		(28–13)		Chuzhou International Handball Hall, Chuzhou
19 July 2026; 18:00		Report		Chuzhou International Handball Hall, Chuzhou

20 July 2026; 10:00	Chinese Taipei	38–16	Hong Kong	Chuzhou International Handball Hall, Chuzhou
20 July 2026; 10:00		(19–11)		Chuzhou International Handball Hall, Chuzhou
20 July 2026; 10:00		Report		Chuzhou International Handball Hall, Chuzhou

20 July 2026; 14:00	Saudi Arabia	35–30	China	Chuzhou International Handball Hall, Chuzhou
20 July 2026; 14:00		(20–18)		Chuzhou International Handball Hall, Chuzhou
20 July 2026; 14:00		Report		Chuzhou International Handball Hall, Chuzhou

20 July 2026; 18:00	Oman	23–33	Bahrain	Chuzhou International Handball Hall, Chuzhou
20 July 2026; 18:00		(13–15)		Chuzhou International Handball Hall, Chuzhou
20 July 2026; 18:00		Report		Chuzhou International Handball Hall, Chuzhou

22 July 2026; 10:00	Hong Kong	11–46	Saudi Arabia	Chuzhou International Handball Hall, Chuzhou
22 July 2026; 10:00		(5–25)		Chuzhou International Handball Hall, Chuzhou
22 July 2026; 10:00		Report		Chuzhou International Handball Hall, Chuzhou

22 July 2026; 14:00	Oman	26–41	Chinese Taipei	Chuzhou International Handball Hall, Chuzhou
22 July 2026; 14:00		(12–18)		Chuzhou International Handball Hall, Chuzhou
22 July 2026; 14:00		Report		Chuzhou International Handball Hall, Chuzhou

22 July 2026; 18:00	China	27–35	Bahrain	Chuzhou International Handball Hall, Chuzhou
22 July 2026; 18:00		(12–18)		Chuzhou International Handball Hall, Chuzhou
22 July 2026; 18:00		Report		Chuzhou International Handball Hall, Chuzhou

=== Group B ===
Pos	Team	Pld	W	D	L	GF	GA	GD	Pts	Qualification
1	South Korea	6	5	1	0	198	158	+40	11	Quarterfinals
2	United Arab Emirates	6	4	2	0	197	157	+40	10	Quarterfinals
3	Iran	6	3	1	2	198	148	+50	7	Quarterfinals
4	Kuwait	6	3	0	3	190	165	+25	6	Quarterfinals
5	Qatar	6	2	0	4	184	164	+20	4	Ninth place game
6	Japan	6	2	0	4	184	160	+24	4	Eleventh place game
7	India	6	0	0	6	109	308	−199	0	13th place

Source: AHF

Qatar finished ahead of Japan on the head-to-head result (29–25), despite having a lower overall goal difference.

15 July 2026; 10:00	Qatar	27–28	South Korea	Chuzhou International Handball Hall, Chuzhou
15 July 2026; 10:00		(16–13)		Chuzhou International Handball Hall, Chuzhou
15 July 2026; 10:00		Report		Chuzhou International Handball Hall, Chuzhou

15 July 2026; 14:00	Iran	29–27	Kuwait	Chuzhou International Handball Hall, Chuzhou
15 July 2026; 14:00		(15–13)		Chuzhou International Handball Hall, Chuzhou
15 July 2026; 14:00		Report		Chuzhou International Handball Hall, Chuzhou

15 July 2026; 18:00	Japan	29–32	United Arab Emirates	Chuzhou International Handball Hall, Chuzhou
15 July 2026; 18:00		(17–14)		Chuzhou International Handball Hall, Chuzhou
15 July 2026; 18:00		Report		Chuzhou International Handball Hall, Chuzhou

16 July 2026; 10:00	South Korea	29–28	Iran	Chuzhou International Handball Hall, Chuzhou
16 July 2026; 10:00		(13–14)		Chuzhou International Handball Hall, Chuzhou
16 July 2026; 10:00		Report		Chuzhou International Handball Hall, Chuzhou

16 July 2026; 14:00	United Arab Emirates	29–24	Qatar	Chuzhou International Handball Hall, Chuzhou
16 July 2026; 14:00		(12–9)		Chuzhou International Handball Hall, Chuzhou
16 July 2026; 14:00		Report		Chuzhou International Handball Hall, Chuzhou

16 July 2026; 18:00	Japan	47–14	India	Chuzhou International Handball Hall, Chuzhou
16 July 2026; 18:00		(21–5)		Chuzhou International Handball Hall, Chuzhou
16 July 2026; 18:00		Report		Chuzhou International Handball Hall, Chuzhou

17 July 2026; 14:00	United Arab Emirates	25–25	Iran	Chuzhou International Handball Hall, Chuzhou
17 July 2026; 14:00		(10–12)		Chuzhou International Handball Hall, Chuzhou
17 July 2026; 14:00		Report		Chuzhou International Handball Hall, Chuzhou

17 July 2026; 16:00	Qatar	29–25	Japan	Chuzhou International Handball Hall, Chuzhou
17 July 2026; 16:00		(15–13)		Chuzhou International Handball Hall, Chuzhou
17 July 2026; 16:00		Report		Chuzhou International Handball Hall, Chuzhou

17 July 2026; 18:00	India	15–47	Kuwait	Chuzhou International Handball Hall, Chuzhou
17 July 2026; 18:00		(4–26)		Chuzhou International Handball Hall, Chuzhou
17 July 2026; 18:00		Report		Chuzhou International Handball Hall, Chuzhou

19 July 2026; 12:00	Qatar	25–26	Iran	Chuzhou International Handball Hall, Chuzhou
19 July 2026; 12:00		(12–11)		Chuzhou International Handball Hall, Chuzhou
19 July 2026; 12:00		Report		Chuzhou International Handball Hall, Chuzhou

19 July 2026; 16:00	India	19–49	South Korea	Chuzhou International Handball Hall, Chuzhou
19 July 2026; 16:00		(8–25)		Chuzhou International Handball Hall, Chuzhou
19 July 2026; 16:00		Report		Chuzhou International Handball Hall, Chuzhou

19 July 2026; 20:00	Kuwait	30–29	Japan	Chuzhou International Handball Hall, Chuzhou
19 July 2026; 20:00		(13–16)		Chuzhou International Handball Hall, Chuzhou
19 July 2026; 20:00		Report		Chuzhou International Handball Hall, Chuzhou

20 July 2026; 12:00	United Arab Emirates	52–21	India	Chuzhou International Handball Hall, Chuzhou
20 July 2026; 12:00		(26–11)		Chuzhou International Handball Hall, Chuzhou
20 July 2026; 12:00		Report		Chuzhou International Handball Hall, Chuzhou

20 July 2026; 16:00	Iran	27–28	Japan	Chuzhou International Handball Hall, Chuzhou
20 July 2026; 16:00		(14–14)		Chuzhou International Handball Hall, Chuzhou
20 July 2026; 16:00		Report		Chuzhou International Handball Hall, Chuzhou

20 July 2026; 20:00	South Korea	34–28	Kuwait	Chuzhou International Handball Hall, Chuzhou
20 July 2026; 20:00		(14–10)		Chuzhou International Handball Hall, Chuzhou
20 July 2026; 20:00		Report		Chuzhou International Handball Hall, Chuzhou

21 July 2026; 14:00	Iran	63–14	India	Chuzhou International Handball Hall, Chuzhou
21 July 2026; 14:00		(32–6)		Chuzhou International Handball Hall, Chuzhou
21 July 2026; 14:00		Report		Chuzhou International Handball Hall, Chuzhou

21 July 2026; 16:00	Kuwait	30–29	Qatar	Chuzhou International Handball Hall, Chuzhou
21 July 2026; 16:00		(15–13)		Chuzhou International Handball Hall, Chuzhou
21 July 2026; 16:00		Report		Chuzhou International Handball Hall, Chuzhou

21 July 2026; 18:00	South Korea	30–30	United Arab Emirates	Chuzhou International Handball Hall, Chuzhou
21 July 2026; 18:00		(15–16)		Chuzhou International Handball Hall, Chuzhou
21 July 2026; 18:00		Report		Chuzhou International Handball Hall, Chuzhou

22 July 2026; 12:00	India	26–50	Qatar	Chuzhou International Handball Hall, Chuzhou
22 July 2026; 12:00		(11–21)		Chuzhou International Handball Hall, Chuzhou
22 July 2026; 12:00		Report		Chuzhou International Handball Hall, Chuzhou

22 July 2026; 16:00	Kuwait	28–29	United Arab Emirates	Chuzhou International Handball Hall, Chuzhou
22 July 2026; 16:00		(10–15)		Chuzhou International Handball Hall, Chuzhou
22 July 2026; 16:00		Report		Chuzhou International Handball Hall, Chuzhou

22 July 2026; 20:00	Japan	26–28	South Korea	Chuzhou International Handball Hall, Chuzhou
22 July 2026; 20:00		(14–14)		Chuzhou International Handball Hall, Chuzhou
22 July 2026; 20:00		Report		Chuzhou International Handball Hall, Chuzhou

== Placement matches ==
The fifth- and sixth-placed teams in the preliminary groups contested the ninth- and eleventh-place matches, respectively, on 25 July.

=== Eleventh place game ===
25 July 2026; 10:00	Hong Kong	16–40	Japan	Chuzhou International Handball Hall, Chuzhou
25 July 2026; 10:00		(7–21)		Chuzhou International Handball Hall, Chuzhou
25 July 2026; 10:00		Report		Chuzhou International Handball Hall, Chuzhou

=== Ninth place game ===
25 July 2026; 12:00	Oman	24–45	Qatar	Chuzhou International Handball Hall, Chuzhou
25 July 2026; 12:00		(9–26)		Chuzhou International Handball Hall, Chuzhou
25 July 2026; 12:00		Report		Chuzhou International Handball Hall, Chuzhou

== Knockout stage ==
The quarterfinals took place on 24 July, followed by the semifinals and the first round of fifth- to eighth-place classification matches on 25 July. The final classification matches took place on 27 July. Each of the four quarterfinal winners qualified for the 2027 Men's Junior World Handball Championship.

=== Championship bracket ===
Quarterfinals
24 July
Bahrain	31
Iran	24
24 July
South Korea	30
Chinese Taipei	26
24 July
United Arab Emirates	37
China	28
24 July
Saudi Arabia	25
Kuwait	23

Semifinals
25 July
Bahrain	31
South Korea	32
25 July
United Arab Emirates	31
Saudi Arabia	30

Final
27 July
South Korea	25
United Arab Emirates	24
Third place
27 July
Saudi Arabia	37
Bahrain	27

=== Fifth to eighth place bracket ===
Fifth–eighth place semifinals
25 July
Iran	30
Chinese Taipei	35
25 July
China	31
Kuwait	36

Fifth place
27 July
Chinese Taipei	29
Kuwait	30
Seventh place
27 July
Iran	38
China	31

=== Quarterfinals ===
24 July 2026; 12:00	Bahrain	31–24	Iran	Chuzhou International Handball Hall, Chuzhou
24 July 2026; 12:00		(14–11)		Chuzhou International Handball Hall, Chuzhou
24 July 2026; 12:00		Report		Chuzhou International Handball Hall, Chuzhou

24 July 2026; 14:00	United Arab Emirates	37–28	China	Chuzhou International Handball Hall, Chuzhou
24 July 2026; 14:00		(21–12)		Chuzhou International Handball Hall, Chuzhou
24 July 2026; 14:00		Report		Chuzhou International Handball Hall, Chuzhou

24 July 2026; 16:00	Saudi Arabia	25–23	Kuwait	Chuzhou International Handball Hall, Chuzhou
24 July 2026; 16:00		(13–7)		Chuzhou International Handball Hall, Chuzhou
24 July 2026; 16:00		Report		Chuzhou International Handball Hall, Chuzhou

24 July 2026; 18:00	South Korea	30–26	Chinese Taipei	Chuzhou International Handball Hall, Chuzhou
24 July 2026; 18:00		(14–14)		Chuzhou International Handball Hall, Chuzhou
24 July 2026; 18:00		Report		Chuzhou International Handball Hall, Chuzhou

=== Fifth to eighth place semifinals ===
25 July 2026; 14:00	Iran	30–35	Chinese Taipei	Chuzhou International Handball Hall, Chuzhou
25 July 2026; 14:00		(17–17)		Chuzhou International Handball Hall, Chuzhou
25 July 2026; 14:00		Report		Chuzhou International Handball Hall, Chuzhou

25 July 2026; 16:00	China	31–36	Kuwait	Chuzhou International Handball Hall, Chuzhou
25 July 2026; 16:00		(17–21)		Chuzhou International Handball Hall, Chuzhou
25 July 2026; 16:00		Report		Chuzhou International Handball Hall, Chuzhou

=== Semifinals ===
25 July 2026; 18:00	Bahrain	31–32	South Korea	Chuzhou International Handball Hall, Chuzhou
25 July 2026; 18:00		(14–15)		Chuzhou International Handball Hall, Chuzhou
25 July 2026; 18:00		Report		Chuzhou International Handball Hall, Chuzhou

25 July 2026; 20:00	United Arab Emirates	31–30	Saudi Arabia	Chuzhou International Handball Hall, Chuzhou
25 July 2026; 20:00		(15–16)		Chuzhou International Handball Hall, Chuzhou
25 July 2026; 20:00		Report		Chuzhou International Handball Hall, Chuzhou

=== Seventh place game ===
27 July 2026; 14:00	Iran	38–31	China	Chuzhou International Handball Hall, Chuzhou
27 July 2026; 14:00		(19–16)		Chuzhou International Handball Hall, Chuzhou
27 July 2026; 14:00		Report		Chuzhou International Handball Hall, Chuzhou

=== Fifth place game ===
27 July 2026; 12:00	Chinese Taipei	29–30	Kuwait	Chuzhou International Handball Hall, Chuzhou
27 July 2026; 12:00		(14–13)		Chuzhou International Handball Hall, Chuzhou
27 July 2026; 12:00		Report		Chuzhou International Handball Hall, Chuzhou

=== Third place game ===
27 July 2026; 16:00	Bahrain	27–37	Saudi Arabia	Chuzhou International Handball Hall, Chuzhou
27 July 2026; 16:00		(13–18)		Chuzhou International Handball Hall, Chuzhou
27 July 2026; 16:00		Report		Chuzhou International Handball Hall, Chuzhou

=== Final ===
South Korea overcame an 8–13 half-time deficit to defeat the United Arab Emirates 25–24. Choi Yeon-gu and Ju Yong-chan each scored eight goals for South Korea, and Ju scored the winning goal in the final seconds.

27 July 2026; 18:00	South Korea	25–24	United Arab Emirates	Chuzhou International Handball Hall, Chuzhou
27 July 2026; 18:00		(8–13)		Chuzhou International Handball Hall, Chuzhou
27 July 2026; 18:00		Report		Chuzhou International Handball Hall, Chuzhou

== Awards ==
The AHF announced the following individual award winners and All-Star Team at the conclusion of the tournament.

Award	Player	Team
Most valuable player	Eyad Toukhy	United Arab Emirates
Top scorer	Yosef Madwah (68 goals) (Note: The IHF's post-tournament report instead named Choi Yeongu as the top scorer with 64 goals and credited Madwah with 56 goals, conflicting with the AHF's official award list.)	Kuwait
Best goalkeeper	Salman Adel Al-Muyini	Saudi Arabia
Best left wing	Ahmed Eid	Bahrain
Best left back	Abdullah Nabil Al-Marhoon	Saudi Arabia
Best centre back	Choi Yeongu	South Korea
Best right back	Kim Eun-ho	South Korea
Best right wing	Omar Zaid	United Arab Emirates
Best pivot	Ahmed Nofal	United Arab Emirates

== Final standings ==
The final rankings were confirmed by the AHF and the IHF.

Rank	Team
1st place, gold medalist(s)	South Korea
2nd place, silver medalist(s)	United Arab Emirates
3rd place, bronze medalist(s)	Saudi Arabia
4	Bahrain
5	Kuwait
6	Chinese Taipei
7	Iran
8	China
9	Qatar
10	Oman
11	Japan
12	Hong Kong
13	India

Team qualified for the 2027 U21 World Championship
