= 2022 Asian Men's Junior Handball Championship =

2022 handball championship in Asia

17th Asian Men's Junior Handball Championship 2022

Tournament details
- Host country: Bahrain
- Venue(s): 1 (in 1 host city)
- Dates: 15–24 July
- Teams: 8 (from 1 confederation)

Final positions
- Champions: Japan (1st title)
- Runners-up: Bahrain
- Third place: Kuwait
- Fourth place: Saudi Arabia

Tournament statistics
- Matches played: 20
- Goals scored: 1,180 (59 per match)

The 2022 Asian Men's Junior Handball Championship was the 17th edition of the championship scheduled to be held from 15 to 24 July 2022 in Isa Town, Bahrain under the aegis of Asian Handball Federation (AHF). It was the second time in history that the championship will be organised by the Bahrain Handball Federation (BHF). It also acted as a qualification tournament for the 2023 Men's Junior World Handball Championship, with top four teams from the championship directly qualifying for the event to be jointly hosted by Germany and Greece.

== Draw ==
The draw was held on 8 July 2022 at the Millennium Hotel and Convention Centre, Salmiya, Kuwait.

== Preliminary round ==
All times are local (UTC+3).

=== Group A ===
Pos	Team	Pld	W	D	L	GF	GA	GD	Pts	Qualification
1	Kuwait	3	2	1	0	82	72	+10	5	Semifinals
2	Saudi Arabia	3	2	0	1	90	86	+4	4	Semifinals
3	South Korea	3	1	1	1	86	85	+1	3	5–8th place semifinals
4	Iran	3	0	0	3	75	90	−15	0	5–8th place semifinals

Source: AHF
Rules for classification: 1) Points; 2) Head-to-head points; 3) Head-to-head goal difference; 4) Head-to-head goals scored; 5) Goal difference; 6) Goals scored; 7) Draw.

16 July 2022; 16:00	Saudi Arabia	32–28	Iran	Khalifa Sports City Stadium, Isa Town; Referees: Ismoilov, Ismoilov (UZB)
16 July 2022; 16:00	Al-Khedhrawi 8	(14–13)	Bayat 7	Khalifa Sports City Stadium, Isa Town; Referees: Ismoilov, Ismoilov (UZB)
16 July 2022; 16:00	2× (suspension) 1× (red card)	Report	6× (suspension)	Khalifa Sports City Stadium, Isa Town; Referees: Ismoilov, Ismoilov (UZB)

16 July 2022; 18:30	South Korea	26–26	Kuwait	Khalifa Sports City Stadium, Isa Town; Referees: Hussein, Imran (IRQ)
16 July 2022; 18:30	Kim D., Song 6	(13–14)	Al-Adwani 8	Khalifa Sports City Stadium, Isa Town; Referees: Hussein, Imran (IRQ)
16 July 2022; 18:30	3× (suspension) 1× (red card)	Report	2× (suspension)	Khalifa Sports City Stadium, Isa Town; Referees: Hussein, Imran (IRQ)

18 July 2022; 16:00	Kuwait	30–26	Saudi Arabia	Khalifa Sports City Stadium, Isa Town; Referees: Ismoilov, Ismoilov (UZB)
18 July 2022; 16:00	Al-Adwani 14	(17–17)	Al-Abdullah 9	Khalifa Sports City Stadium, Isa Town; Referees: Ismoilov, Ismoilov (UZB)
18 July 2022; 16:00	1× (yellow card) 1× (suspension)	Report	1× (yellow card) 1× (suspension)	Khalifa Sports City Stadium, Isa Town; Referees: Ismoilov, Ismoilov (UZB)

18 July 2022; 18:30	Iran	27–32	South Korea	Khalifa Sports City Stadium, Isa Town; Referees: Al-Mawt, Marhoon (BHR)
18 July 2022; 18:30	Ali Akbari 7	(10–16)	Lee J. 6	Khalifa Sports City Stadium, Isa Town; Referees: Al-Mawt, Marhoon (BHR)
18 July 2022; 18:30	1× (yellow card) 6× (suspension)	Report	3× (suspension)	Khalifa Sports City Stadium, Isa Town; Referees: Al-Mawt, Marhoon (BHR)

20 July 2022; 16:00	South Korea	28–32	Saudi Arabia	Khalifa Sports City Stadium, Isa Town; Referees: Al-Mawt, Marhoon (BHR)
20 July 2022; 16:00	Cha 8	(14–15)	Al-Khedhrawi 11	Khalifa Sports City Stadium, Isa Town; Referees: Al-Mawt, Marhoon (BHR)
20 July 2022; 16:00	3× (suspension) 1× (red card)	Report	3× (suspension) 1× (red card)	Khalifa Sports City Stadium, Isa Town; Referees: Al-Mawt, Marhoon (BHR)

20 July 2022; 18:30	Iran	20–26	Kuwait	Khalifa Sports City Stadium, Isa Town; Referees: Hussein, Imran (IRQ)
20 July 2022; 18:30	Ghaffari 7	(6–12)	Al-Mashari 6	Khalifa Sports City Stadium, Isa Town; Referees: Hussein, Imran (IRQ)
20 July 2022; 18:30	5× (suspension) 1× (red card)	Report	1× (suspension)	Khalifa Sports City Stadium, Isa Town; Referees: Hussein, Imran (IRQ)

=== Group B ===
Pos	Team	Pld	W	D	L	GF	GA	GD	Pts	Qualification
1	Bahrain (H)	3	2	1	0	136	69	+67	5 (Note: Bahrain 31–31 Japan)	Semifinals
2	Japan	3	2	1	0	127	63	+64	5	Semifinals
3	Pakistan	3	1	0	2	83	121	−38	2	5–8th place semifinals
4	India	3	0	0	3	46	139	−93	0	5–8th place semifinals

Source: AHF
Rules for classification: 1) Points; 2) Head-to-head points; 3) Head-to-head goal difference; 4) Head-to-head goals scored; 5) Goal difference; 6) Goals scored; 7) Draw.
(H) Hosts
Notes:

15 July 2022; 16:00	Japan	49–11	India	Khalifa Sports City Stadium, Isa Town; Referees: Ghofli, Hassan Zadah (IRI)
15 July 2022; 16:00	Fujisaka 8	(25–6)	Sehdev 4	Khalifa Sports City Stadium, Isa Town; Referees: Ghofli, Hassan Zadah (IRI)
15 July 2022; 16:00	3× (suspension)	Report	1× (suspension)	Khalifa Sports City Stadium, Isa Town; Referees: Ghofli, Hassan Zadah (IRI)

15 July 2022; 18:30	Bahrain	51–26	Pakistan	Khalifa Sports City Stadium, Isa Town; Referees: Lee, Lee (KOR)
15 July 2022; 18:30	A. Ali 10	(27–13)	Tayyab 7	Khalifa Sports City Stadium, Isa Town; Referees: Lee, Lee (KOR)
15 July 2022; 18:30	1× (suspension)	Report	7× (suspension)	Khalifa Sports City Stadium, Isa Town; Referees: Lee, Lee (KOR)

17 July 2022; 16:00	Pakistan	21–47	Japan	Khalifa Sports City Stadium, Isa Town; Referees: Faisal Faraj, Taqi (KUW)
17 July 2022; 16:00	M. Ali 7	(9–21)	Oura 7	Khalifa Sports City Stadium, Isa Town; Referees: Faisal Faraj, Taqi (KUW)
17 July 2022; 16:00	2× (suspension)	Report	1× (yellow card) 1× (suspension)	Khalifa Sports City Stadium, Isa Town; Referees: Faisal Faraj, Taqi (KUW)

17 July 2022; 18:30	India	12–54	Bahrain	Khalifa Sports City Stadium, Isa Town; Referees: Ghofli, Hassan Zadah (IRI)
17 July 2022; 18:30	Vallekadi 5	(7–25)	K. Ali 8	Khalifa Sports City Stadium, Isa Town; Referees: Ghofli, Hassan Zadah (IRI)
17 July 2022; 18:30	4× (suspension) 1× (red card)	Report	3× (suspension)	Khalifa Sports City Stadium, Isa Town; Referees: Ghofli, Hassan Zadah (IRI)

19 July 2022; 16:00	India	23–36	Pakistan	Khalifa Sports City Stadium, Isa Town; Referees: Faisal Faraj, Taqi (KUW)
19 July 2022; 16:00	three players 4	(10–16)	Ahsan Khan 12	Khalifa Sports City Stadium, Isa Town; Referees: Faisal Faraj, Taqi (KUW)
19 July 2022; 16:00		Report	5× (suspension)	Khalifa Sports City Stadium, Isa Town; Referees: Faisal Faraj, Taqi (KUW)

19 July 2022; 18:30	Bahrain	31–31	Japan	Khalifa Sports City Stadium, Isa Town; Referees: Lee, Lee (KOR)
19 July 2022; 18:30	Rabia 9	(14–18)	Arase 9	Khalifa Sports City Stadium, Isa Town; Referees: Lee, Lee (KOR)
19 July 2022; 18:30	1× (suspension)	Report	1× (yellow card) 5× (suspension)	Khalifa Sports City Stadium, Isa Town; Referees: Lee, Lee (KOR)

== Knockout stage ==
=== Bracket ===
Semifinals
22 July
Kuwait	26
Japan	28
22 July
Bahrain	31
Saudi Arabia	26

Final
24 July
Japan	24
Bahrain	20
Third place
24 July
Kuwait	27
Saudi Arabia	21

5–8th place semifinals
22 July
South Korea	56
India	13
22 July
Pakistan	19
Iran	37

Fifth place
23 July
South Korea	33
Iran	26
Seventh place
23 July
India	30
Pakistan	38

=== 5–8th place semifinals ===
22 July 2022; 12:00	South Korea	56–13	India	Khalifa Sports City Stadium, Isa Town; Referees: Ghofli, Hassan (IRI)
22 July 2022; 12:00	An 12	(26–8)	Rajinikanth 6	Khalifa Sports City Stadium, Isa Town; Referees: Ghofli, Hassan (IRI)
22 July 2022; 12:00		Report	1× (yellow card) 2× (suspension)	Khalifa Sports City Stadium, Isa Town; Referees: Ghofli, Hassan (IRI)

22 July 2022; 14:00	Pakistan	19–37	Iran	Khalifa Sports City Stadium, Isa Town; Referees: Faisal Faraj, Taqi (KUW)
22 July 2022; 14:00	Ahsan Khan 5	(9–19)	Fereshteh 12	Khalifa Sports City Stadium, Isa Town; Referees: Faisal Faraj, Taqi (KUW)
22 July 2022; 14:00	2× (suspension)	Report	3× (suspension)	Khalifa Sports City Stadium, Isa Town; Referees: Faisal Faraj, Taqi (KUW)

=== Semifinals ===
22 July 2022; 16:30	Kuwait	26–28	Japan	Khalifa Sports City Stadium, Isa Town; Referees: Ismoilov, Ismoilov (UZB)
22 July 2022; 16:30	Al-Adwani 6	(12–16)	Arase 8	Khalifa Sports City Stadium, Isa Town; Referees: Ismoilov, Ismoilov (UZB)
22 July 2022; 16:30	1× (yellow card) 2× (suspension)	Report	3× (suspension)	Khalifa Sports City Stadium, Isa Town; Referees: Ismoilov, Ismoilov (UZB)

22 July 2022; 19:00	Bahrain	31–26	Saudi Arabia	Khalifa Sports City Stadium, Isa Town; Referees: Lee, Lee (KOR)
22 July 2022; 19:00	Rabia 8	(13–9)	Furaij 7	Khalifa Sports City Stadium, Isa Town; Referees: Lee, Lee (KOR)
22 July 2022; 19:00	3× (yellow card) 6× (suspension)	Report	1× (yellow card) 4× (suspension)	Khalifa Sports City Stadium, Isa Town; Referees: Lee, Lee (KOR)

=== Seventh place game ===
23 July 2022; 16:00	India	30–38	Pakistan	Khalifa Sports City Stadium, Isa Town; Referees: Ghofli, Hassan Zadah (IRI)
23 July 2022; 16:00	Thakran 9	(10–19)	Tayyab 14	Khalifa Sports City Stadium, Isa Town; Referees: Ghofli, Hassan Zadah (IRI)
23 July 2022; 16:00	2× (suspension)	Report	1× (yellow card) 4× (suspension) 1× (red card)	Khalifa Sports City Stadium, Isa Town; Referees: Ghofli, Hassan Zadah (IRI)

=== Fifth place game ===
23 July 2022; 18:00	South Korea	33–26	Iran	Khalifa Sports City Stadium, Isa Town; Referees: Faisal Faraj, Taqi (KUW)
23 July 2022; 18:00	Lee J. 8	(17–11)	Ali Akbari, Shokouhipour 5	Khalifa Sports City Stadium, Isa Town; Referees: Faisal Faraj, Taqi (KUW)
23 July 2022; 18:00	3× (suspension) 1× (red card)	Report	2× (suspension) 1× (red card)	Khalifa Sports City Stadium, Isa Town; Referees: Faisal Faraj, Taqi (KUW)

=== Third place game ===
24 July 2022; 16:30	Kuwait	27–21	Saudi Arabia	Khalifa Sports City Stadium, Isa Town; Referees: Al-Mawt, Marhoon (BHR)
24 July 2022; 16:30	Al-Adwani 6	(12–9)	Al-Mohsen 7	Khalifa Sports City Stadium, Isa Town; Referees: Al-Mawt, Marhoon (BHR)
24 July 2022; 16:30	1× (yellow card) 3× (suspension)	Report	1× (suspension)	Khalifa Sports City Stadium, Isa Town; Referees: Al-Mawt, Marhoon (BHR)

=== Final ===
24 July 2022; 19:00	Japan	24–20	Bahrain	Khalifa Sports City Stadium, Isa Town; Referees: Lee, Lee (KOR)
24 July 2022; 19:00	Fujisaka 8	(12–7)	Rabia 7	Khalifa Sports City Stadium, Isa Town; Referees: Lee, Lee (KOR)
24 July 2022; 19:00	1× (yellow card) 1× (suspension)	Report	1× (yellow card) 1× (suspension) 1× (red card)	Khalifa Sports City Stadium, Isa Town; Referees: Lee, Lee (KOR)

== Final standings ==
Rank	Team
1st place, gold medalist(s)	Japan
2nd place, silver medalist(s)	Bahrain
3rd place, bronze medalist(s)	Kuwait
4	Saudi Arabia
5	South Korea
6	Iran
7	Pakistan
8	India

Team qualified for the 2023 Junior World Championship
