= Japan men's national junior handball team =

Japanese handball team

Japan

Information
- Association: Japan Handball Association

Colours
1st	2nd

Results

IHF U-21 World Championship
- Appearances: 7 (First in 1979)
- Best result: 11th place : (1985)

Asian Men's Junior Handball Championship
- Appearances: 19 (First in 1988)
- Best result: (gold) Champions (2022, 2024)
- Last updated on Unknown.

The Japan national junior handball team is the national under-20 handball team of Japan. Controlled by the Japan Handball Association That is an affiliate of the International Handball Federation IHF as well as a member of the Asian Handball Federation AHF. The Team represents Japan in international matches.

== Statistics ==
=== IHF Junior World Championship record ===
Champions Runners up Third place Fourth place

Year	Round	Position	GP	W	D	L	GS	GA	GD
1977 (Sweden)	Didn't Qualify								
1979 (Denmark) (Sweden)		19th place							
1981 (Portugal)		16th place							
1983 (Finland)	Didn't Qualify								
1985 (Italy)		11th place							
1987 (Socialist Federal Republic of Yugoslavia)	Didn't Qualify								
1989 (Spain)	Didn't Qualify								
1991 (Greece)	Didn't Qualify								
1993 (Egypt)	Didn't Qualify								
1995 (Argentina)	Didn't Qualify								
1997 (Turkey)	Didn't Qualify								
1999 (Qatar)	Didn't Qualify								
2001 (Switzerland)	Didn't Qualify								
2003 (Brazil)	Didn't Qualify								
2005 (Hungary)	Didn't Qualify								
2007 (North Macedonia)	Didn't Qualify								
2009 (Egypt)	Didn't Qualify								
2011 (Greece)	Didn't Qualify								
2013 (Bosnia and Herzegovina)	Didn't Qualify								
2015 (Brazil)		18th place							
2017 (Algeria)	Didn't Qualify								
2019 (Spain)		18th place							
2023 (Germany) (Greece)		19th place							
2025 (Poland)		16th place							
Total	7/24	0 Titles							

=== Asian Championship ===
Champions Runners up Third place Fourth place

Asian Men's Junior Handball Championship records
Year	Position	GP	W	D	L	GS	GA	GD
(Syria) 1988	7th place							
(Iran) 1990	4th place							
(China) 1992	3rd place							
(Syria) 1994	5th place							
(Egypt) 1996	6th place							
(Bahrain) 1998	10th place							
(Iran) 2000	7th place							
(Thailand) 2002	5th place							
(India) 2004	4th place							
(Japan) 2006	5th place							
(Jordan) 2008	8th place							
(Iran) 2010	5th place							
(Qatar) 2012	5th place							
(Iran) 2014	3rd place							
(Jordan) 2016	4th place							
(Oman) 2018	Runners-up							
(Bahrain) 2022	Champions							
(Jordan) 2024	Champions							
(China) 2026	11th place							
Total	19/19							

== Squad ==
Last world championship

- 1 HIRAO Katsuki
- 2 TAKANO Sota
- 3 SUEOKA Takumi
- 6 HATTORI Masanari
- 7 TOKUDA Rennesuke
- 11 FUJITA Ryuga
- 13 YANO Seito
- 15 SAKURAI Tomoya
- 16 NAKAMURA Hikaru
- 21 NAKAMURA Tsubasa
- 22 TAKAHASHI Kai
- 25 KAWASAKI Shun
- 27 OSUGI Takumi
- 29 ISODA Kenta
- 31 AO Masatoshi
- 32 TSUYUKI Ryo
