= Kang Tan =

Korean handball player

Personal information
- Nationality: Korean
- Born: 22 September 1999 (age 27)
- Height: 1.86 m (6 ft 1 in)

Sport
- Sport: Handball
- Position: Centre back
- Current club: Korea National Sport University
National team
Years	Team	Apps
–	Korea	9
Medal record
Asian Championship
Silver medal – second place	2020 Kuwait

Kang Tan (born 22 September 1999) is a Korean handball player for Korea National Sport University and the Korean national team.

He represented Korea at the 2019 World Men's Handball Championship.
