= Ahmed Ali (handballer) =

Egyptian handball player

Personal information
- Nationality: Egyptian
- Born: 10 January 1973 (age 52)

Sport
- Sport: Handball

Ahmed Ali (born 10 January 1973) is an Egyptian handball player. He competed in the men's tournament at the 1996 Summer Olympics.
