= South Korea men's national junior handball team =

South Korean handball team

South Korea

Information
- Association: Korea Handball Federation

Colours
1st	2nd

Results

IHF U-21 World Championship
- Appearances: 13 (First in 1985)
- Best result: 9th place : (1989)
- Last updated on Unknown.

The South Korea national junior handball team is the national under-20 handball team of South Korea. Controlled by the Korea Handball Federation, that is an affiliate of the International Handball Federation IHF as well as a member of the Asian Handball Federation AHF, The team represents South Korea in international matches.

== Statistics ==
=== IHF Junior World Championship record ===
Champions Runners up Third place Fourth place

Year	Round	Position	GP	W	D	L	GS	GA	GD
1977 (Sweden)	Didn't Qualify								
1979 (Denmark) (Sweden)	Didn't Qualify								
1981 (Portugal)	Didn't Qualify								
1983 (Finland)	Didn't Qualify								
1985 (Italy)		13th place							
1987 (Socialist Federal Republic of Yugoslavia)		14th place							
1989 (Spain)	Eight-Finals	9th place							
1991 (Greece)		12th place							
1993 (Egypt)		15th place							
1995 (Argentina)	Didn't Qualify								
1997 (Turkey)	Didn't Qualify								
1999 (Qatar)	Didn't Qualify								
2001 (Switzerland)	Didn't Qualify								
2003 (Brazil)	Didn't Qualify								
2005 (Hungary)		12th place							
2007 (North Macedonia)		11th place							
2009 (Egypt)	Didn't Qualify								
2011 (Greece)		19th place							
2013 (Bosnia and Herzegovina)		18th place							
2015 (Brazil)		11th place							
2017 (Algeria)		19th place							
2019 (Spain)		16th place							
2023 (Germany) (Greece)	Didn't Qualify								
2025 (Poland)		24th place							
Total	13/24	0 Titles							
